= Leon Tomșa =

Prince of Wallachia from 1629 to 1632

Leon Tomșa (Leon Vodă, Alion)
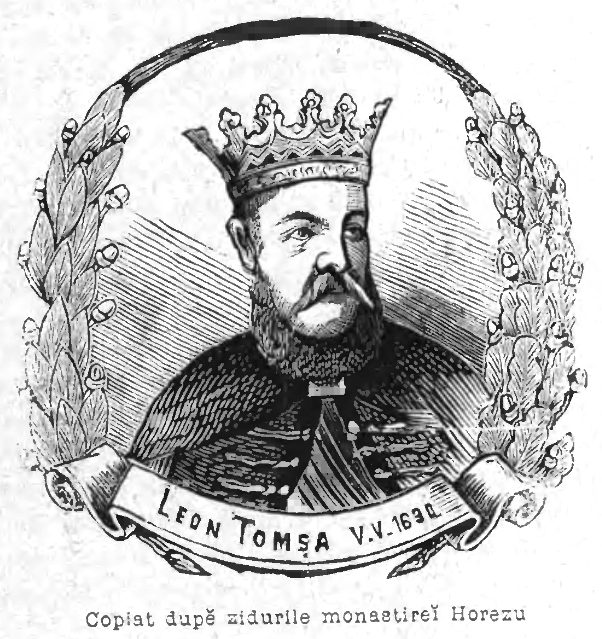
- Leon in an 1891 lithograph by Dimitrie Papazoglu, based on depiction at Horezu Monastery

Prince of Wallachia
- Reign: ca. October 15, 1629 – July 1632
- Predecessor: Alexandru IV Iliaș
- Successor: Radu Iliaș
- Born: unknown date Istanbul?
- Died: unknown date
- Spouse: Roxanda? Victoria
- Issue: Bogdan? Radu Leon?
- Dynasty: Tomșa?
- Father: Ștefan IX Tomșa?
- Mother: Axanina?
- Religion: Orthodox

Leon Tomșa, also known as Leon Vodă ("Leon the Voivode") or Alion, was the Prince of Wallachia from October 1629 to July 1632. He claimed to be a son of Ștefan IX Tomșa, and as such a Moldavian, but was generally identified as a Greek of lowly origins, and reportedly an oyster-monger. He was imposed on the throne by the Ottoman Empire, one of a line of Princes who were primarily subservient to Ottoman power. In his first year, he also supported the political ascendancy of Greeks and Levantines, many of whom made their way into Wallachia's traditional aristocracy, or boyardom. This upset the local boyars, who were further alienated and impoverished by Leon's fiscal policies, which in turn reflected Ottoman demands for tribute. The regime was threatened by an Oltenia-centered rebellion, initially led by Ban Aslan, and later by Matei Basarab. Though often depicted as an anti-Greek movement, it had Greeks and Romanians fighting on either side.

In its second phase, Leon's rule became more conciliatory, granting massive fiscal privileges to the administrative class, the clergy and, selectively, the serfs. The Prince also issued a ban on Greek immigration, though he was still lenient toward naturalized Greeks; he ended some of the privileges granted to Mount Athos, and made foreigners subject to taxation, while also reinforcing special rules against the social integration of Muslim converts. Such measures failed to convince the boyar rebels, who organized an invasion of Wallachia from over the border, in the Principality of Transylvania. They managed to occupy Oltenia and threatened Bucharest, but were routed by Leon in August 1631. Aslan abandoned the cause, while Matei continued with his plotting from Transylvania.

In his final months, Leon, persuaded that he owed his triumph to Saint George, was a noted patron of religious art, building Slobozia Church and refurbishing Viforâta Monastery. His contribution also extended to lay themes, and he was one of the first Wallachians to sponsor Western-style portrait painting, employing the services of a master Benedetto. He was nevertheless deposed by Sultan Murad IV; his later life and date of death are unknown. In the 1660s, his presumed son Radu Leon ascended to the Wallachian throne, and initially also pursued the Hellenophile line. After an extended conflict with the Cantacuzino family, he was forced to reinstate Leon's ban, and, like Leon, was ultimately deposed. Leon's alleged grandson, Ștefan Radu Tomșa, was titular Hetman of Right-bank Ukraine, and a nominal heir to the Moldavian throne.

== Reign ==
=== Context ===
Little is known about the Prince's early life, beyond clues suggesting he was not a local. Visitor Paul Strassburg described him an Ottoman Greek. The 1660s chronicler and compiler Macarios Zaim sees him as entirely a "Greek foreigner" from Istanbul, while other authors believe that he was at least half-Greek, on his father's side. However, Leon viewed himself as the son of Ștefan IX Tomșa, who had served as Moldavian Prince in the 1610s and had died in exile in Istanbul. He therefore also regarded himself as brothers-in-law with the Moldavian boyar Pătrașco Boul, who had wed Ștefan's daughter, and whom he invited to Wallachia. Apparently, Leon also took with him one of Ștefan IX's Greek advisers, known locally as Alexandri, though the identification remains uncertain.

Leon's genealogical claim was already widely discredited in his lifetime, with various accounts showing that he had worked as an oyster-monger. In such sources, he is sometimes referred to as Leon Stridie ("Leon the Oyster"), Leon Stridiacul ("Leon of the Oyster"), or Pescarul ("Fisherman"). According to scholar Constantin Rezachevici, Leon's claim of princely descent was "formulaic", with a minimal effort to ensure legitimacy under the Wallachian canons. Nevertheless, a lity of Probota Monastery, compiled in 1781 and rediscovered in 2008, confirms at least that Ștefan and his wife Axanina had had a son of that name. The list also mentions Leon being married to a Lady Roxanda, and having a son, Bogdan, who was probably dead by 1630.

Leon's life coincided with a decline of sovereignty in both Wallachia and Moldavia, which were already tributary states of the Ottoman Empire (see Early Modern Romania). Ștefan, his supposed father, had been a loyal exponent of "Ottomanization" in both his state policy and his private life, and signed his documents with a tughra-like ornament. In 1629, both countries were still struggling with the consequences of the Long Turkish War, when Michael the Brave and Radu Șerban successively attempted to restore Wallachian independence. As historian Ion-Radu Mircea notes, "a grave conflict opposing Wallachia to the Sublime Porte had occurred in 1595–1611, provoked by heavy feudal duties and the Turks' ever-increasing interference in country affairs". Radu Mihnea, as the first Prince of Wallachia directly appointed by the Porte, had helped to "relaunch these antagonisms" in the 1610s and 1620s. As scholar Neagu Djuvara notes, the Ottomans made sure that both Wallachia and Moldavia were "militarily insignificant" by this moment in time, on their way to becoming "mere pawns in games of the great powers".

In both countries, Ottoman fiscal demands had declined after the Long War, stabilizing themselves at possibly a third of the previous decade (see Transformation of the Ottoman Empire). Nevertheless, a European-wide contraction of the cattle trade brought recession, especially in Wallachia. The increase in Ottoman political controls also came with a cultural and social shift, which generated internal conflicts. According to social historian Răzvan Theodorescu, Radu Mihnea's takeover marked a "Levantine wave" and "Oriental cultural climate", also preserved under Alexandru Coconul, then under Alexandru IV Iliaș. Scholar Radu G. Păun argues that Greeks and Phanariotes were "indispensable" as experienced diplomats. Păun concludes that, for this reason, foreigners were over-represented among the most powerful boyars, accounting for 14 out of 30 Wallachian Chamberlains (Postelnici, singular Postelnic) in 1600–1700.

Both the local boyardom and peasantry acted against this state of affairs, and more specifically against the influx of Greeks. Resentments peaked under Iliaș, with violent revolts centered on Oltenia. One was led by Paharnic Lupu Mehedințeanu, and another by a commoner or a boyar's son, Paisie. Historian Constantin Iordachi counts three "violent anti-Greek plots" in the 1611–1618 interval. Under Alexandru Coconul, the peasant cavalry, or Călărași, staged a tax revolt, and was only narrowly defeated, by other branches of the Wallachian military forces, outside Buftea.

=== Rise and clientele ===
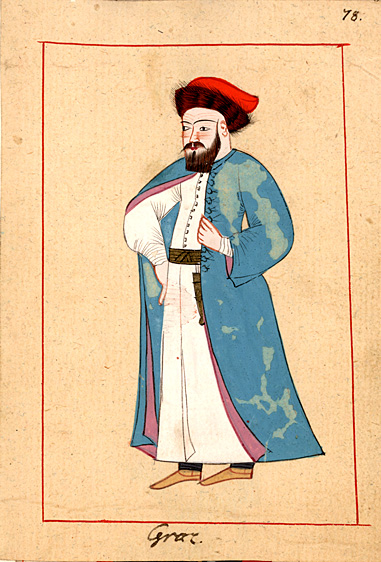
Miniature portrait of an Ottoman Greek man. From the 1657 muraqqa preserved by Claes Rålamb

One account suggests that Leon engaged in bribing the Ottoman officials, who would have ensured his appointment as Prince, running into massive debt. Eventually, Sultan Murad IV ordered Alexandru IV to step down and proclaimed Leon as the Prince; he took the throne at some point before October 15, 1629, and continued the process of Hellenization. Aside from questions regarding his own ethnic origin, his Princess-consort, Victoria, was referred to as a "Levantine". His controversial overtures toward Greek culture included dedicating Ghiorma Church in Bucharest to the monks of Pogoniani, who reportedly used it as a major source of income. However, in early 1630 he also intervened to protect the local monks of Strâmba, who had been persecuted and dispossessed under Alexandru IV.

Leon's own court was largely perceived by adversaries as a "Greek" cabal, but, according to Rezachevici, this point is rhetorical, not factual: "We must not view 'Greeks' as meaning only persons of this background, but generally south-of-the-Danube people, and even Romanians, who were loyal to the Prince." Iordachi also describes Leon as having been "accompanied by a large Greek clientele". However, "the meaning of generic terms such as 'Greeks' [...] changed gradually, both in the official imperial discourse and in the self-understanding or self-identification of the peoples living in the empire, from predominantly social categories in the pre-nationalist age to modern ethno-national categories in the age of nationalism."

As Rezachevici notes, in 1630 Leon's Boyar Divan comprised four Greeks, including Postelnic Alexandri and Paharnic Balasache Muselim, four Romanians, and one Albanian—Miho, brother of the more famous Leca Racotă. Among the leading courtiers was Vistier Necula Catargiu. He was a member of a culturally Greek family, described by chronicler Matthew of Myra as "archons of the Eastern Empire", but may have actually had Gagauz origins. In February 1630, he received from Leon a share of the Bucharest princely vineyards. Part of Wallachia's army was led by Ghiorma Alexeanu, an orphaned adventurer of Phanariote origin. Leon's retinue also included a Muslim convert, Apostolos or Kürt Salman Çavuş, who was the son of a Ban Iane, and as such probably a renegade member of the Cantacuzino family. The regime was endorsed by a Bosnian banker, identified in sources as Matei "Latinul" ("the Latin") of Saraybosna. He was recognized by Leon as the owner of Pleașov village, while also serving as Postelnic.

=== Aslan's revolt ===
==== Early stages ====
In addition to heightening tensions between the boyar factions, the new regime also imposed a fiscal policy that was increasingly unpopular. In 1629, George Apafi, an itinerant Hungarian aristocrat, noted that tax increases had "depleted the country", pushing taxpayers into hiding or exile, to the point where even horses had become a scarce commodity. His travel account is also the first source mentioning a multitude of derelicts, or calici, living on the outskirts of Bucharest. Leon also enforced the treatment of serfs as immovable assets on the land they labored, explicitly confirming rules set under Michael the Brave. During a trial July 1630, he clarified that the peasants of Ciomăgești could never apply for manumission. He also clamped down on itinerant trades, being the first Wallachian ruler to collect a tithe from shepherds, and possibly the first of several Princes to impose a special tax on Moldavian artisans. In private, Leon reportedly complained that his policies were driven by the haraç and other Ottoman demands. He claimed that gold and silver were not being mined in Wallachia on purpose, "so that the Turk cannot enjoy a full taste of [Wallachia's] treasures and nab [Wallachia] away from her Christians."

The series of rebellions and riots was resumed in October 1630, when Aslan, deposed Ban of Oltenia, led the local boyars into open revolt, aiming to crown himself Prince. Though this movement also presented itself as nativist to some degree, Aslan was himself a Greek on his father's side; its immediate cause was another tax hike, which had driven the lesser boyars into insolvency. The Oltenian Matei Basarab, a former Aga in the Wallachian military forces, provided Aslan with significant backing, as did other boyars whom Leon had had replaced. According to various reports, Catargiu "invaded" land retained by the Craiovești house in Romanați County, splitting the Aga's inheritance; as a tax farmer, Matei was also confronted with the massive flight of his fiscal base into the Principality of Transylvania. Moreover, Leon held boyars "responsible for levying taxes in the territories under their jurisdiction, thus making them liable for those taxes that had to be covered by eventual fugitives from their estates."

The boyar party also crossed the border in protest, placing their faith in a Transylvanian alliance. Most of them, including Aslan, passed into Țara Hațegului on October 13–18 (New Style: October 23–28). They incited serfs and other social categories to join them there, while also inviting Transylvanian Romanians to rally to their cause and help them conquer Oltenia. One contemporary account suggests that they were able to enlist 1,000 runaway Wallachian serfs, whom they also used to confirm petitions they addressed to the Sultan and to George II Rákóczi, the reigning Prince of Transylvania.

Rákóczi was interested in the planned insurrection, receiving the fugitives at his court in Feyérvár (Bălgrad). He hoped to use the boyars as negotiators of an alliance between his country and the Ottoman Empire. Through Rákóczi, Aslan was able to contact Abaza Mehmed Pasha. However, some of the rebels were intimidated by Leon's threats of land confiscation, and began returning from Transylvania; Leon issued them safe conducts, or "pacification charters" (cărți de împăcare). Similarly, he pardoned some of the runaway serfs of Jiblea and Spinu, in exchange for their protection of Transylvanian traders who still supplied ropes to the Oltenian salt mines. In May 1631, faced with the disappearance of an entire serf community at Tutana, he made an exemption from his old ruling against manumission.

==== Concessions ====
Map of Aslan and Matei Basarab's revolt, 1630 through 1632

By then, however, the Aslan uprising had become a "strong popular movement", or "the strongest anti-Greek reaction from all the 'privileged' social categories". This threat forced Leon to reconsider his core policies. In July 1631, he called upon the estates of the realm, though the process was still controlled by the Divan's grand boyars. At the end of the proceedings, Leon granted tax privileges and a degree of immunity to the major boyar families, including their virtual exemption from the capital punishment. Lesser fiscal privileges were extended to other categories: non-titular boyars, scribes, professional soldiers, and priests of the Wallachian Church.

Leon also ordered the expulsion from Wallachia of all "evil Greeks of Tsargrad"—that is, Greeks who had not been naturalized by that point in time. The Divan was supposedly purged, though, as Rezachevici notes, only some of the Greek "Divanites" were ever demoted; others, such as Constantin Cantacuzino and Pavlakis Caradja, were simply moved to a privy council. The new measures mostly affected lesser categories: all Greek property owners were made subject to the income tax, while males who had married locals were required to perform military service alongside free peasants and burghers, as "Redcoats". Tomșa's reign provided an additional landmark case in Wallachian law, reinforcing existing provisions against the spread of Islam and dismissing equality for Muslims. In late 1631, the Divan ruled against Leon's Muslim courtier, Kürt Salman, preventing him from recovering property his father had owned in Wallachia; the plaintiff was described as being "unprotected by laws".

Such edicts were never expanded to discriminate against the Greek or Levantine clergy, which remained distinctly cosmopolitan. As noted by theologian Constantin C. Cojocaru, "the Wallachians were never as intransigent as the Moldavians" in this respect. Leon's other nativist concessions included an order to dispossess Mount Athos of some Wallachian monasteries, namely those that Greek monks had received, as metochia, without explicit consent from the ktitors. This process returned to the Wallachian Church full ownership of Argeș, Bistrița, Cotmeana, Cozia, Dealu, Glavacioc, Snagov, and Tismana. However, one record shows that Leon himself donated Dealu, with its agricultural reserve, its customs revenue, and its Gypsy slaves, to the Athonite monks of Iviron. Iviron also received from him the estate of Stelea Church, Bucharest. Separate from this, he donated a Wallachian village to the Church of the Holy Sepulchre and the Jerusalem Patriarchy.

The restrictive measures, Iordachi argues, were "highly illustrative of the transformation of the anti-Greek campaign into a militant program of social and political change." According to Rezachevici, the expulsions were not designed to "obtain the goodwill of exiles", who may have "conditioned their return on the promulgation of such writs". However, they failed to convince the bulk of insurgents: Leon's boyar delegation to Feyérvár ran into Matei and his "Redcoats" at Vulcan Pass; Miho Racotă, sent in to repel this invasion, was defeated at Ungureni, allowing Matei temporary control over Oltenia. Victims of his retribution included Iovan Latinul, father of Leon's Postelnic, who was decapitated at Caracal. Leon prepared for a defense of Muntenia, sending Princess Victoria to a safe haven, in the Ottoman fortress of Giurgiu. The main rebel force pushed toward Bucharest, but, following his grants of privilege, Leon had fuller confidence in his own troops, to whom he promised payments in bullion coin; he was also backed by a native Logothete, Papa Greceanu. On August 13 (23), 1631, Aslan's boyars were defeated on Beilicului Highway, just south of the capital city.

The rebels encountered various losses. A leading partisan, Preda "Floricoiu" of Cepturoaia, was either killed in battle or beheaded soon afterward. The Armaș Pușa (or Nușa) was captured alive, alongside some 40 Transylvanian mercenaries. He was impaled on the spot, while the others were dispatched to Istanbul as war slaves. Loyalists also captured the Aga's nephew, Preda Brâncoveanu, who bought his way out of captivity. Another victory for the loyalists, reportedly led by Ghiorma, was at Aninoasa. A final punitive expedition, led by Pătrașco Boul and Nedelco Boteanu, drove Aslan, Matei and their followers to the northwestern corner of Oltenia. The beleaguered rebels resisted at Tismana and Izvarna, but were finally pushed back into Transylvania. On their return, Boul and Boteanu reportedly ransacked Oltenia "in the worst way."

=== Downfall ===
Following these setbacks, Matei switched tactic, moving to another section of the border, at Făgăraș Citadel, and making more overtures to obtain help from Abaza. From Bucharest, Leon focused on dismantling the Aga's personal estate. By September 5, he had confiscated "all [his] villages and assets", including the ancestral demesne at Betejani-Moldoveni. Matei remained an irreconcilable opponent, whereas most leading figures of the uprising gave up arms. They included Aslan, who swore fealty to Leon and returned, possibly serving another term as Ban in Oltenia.

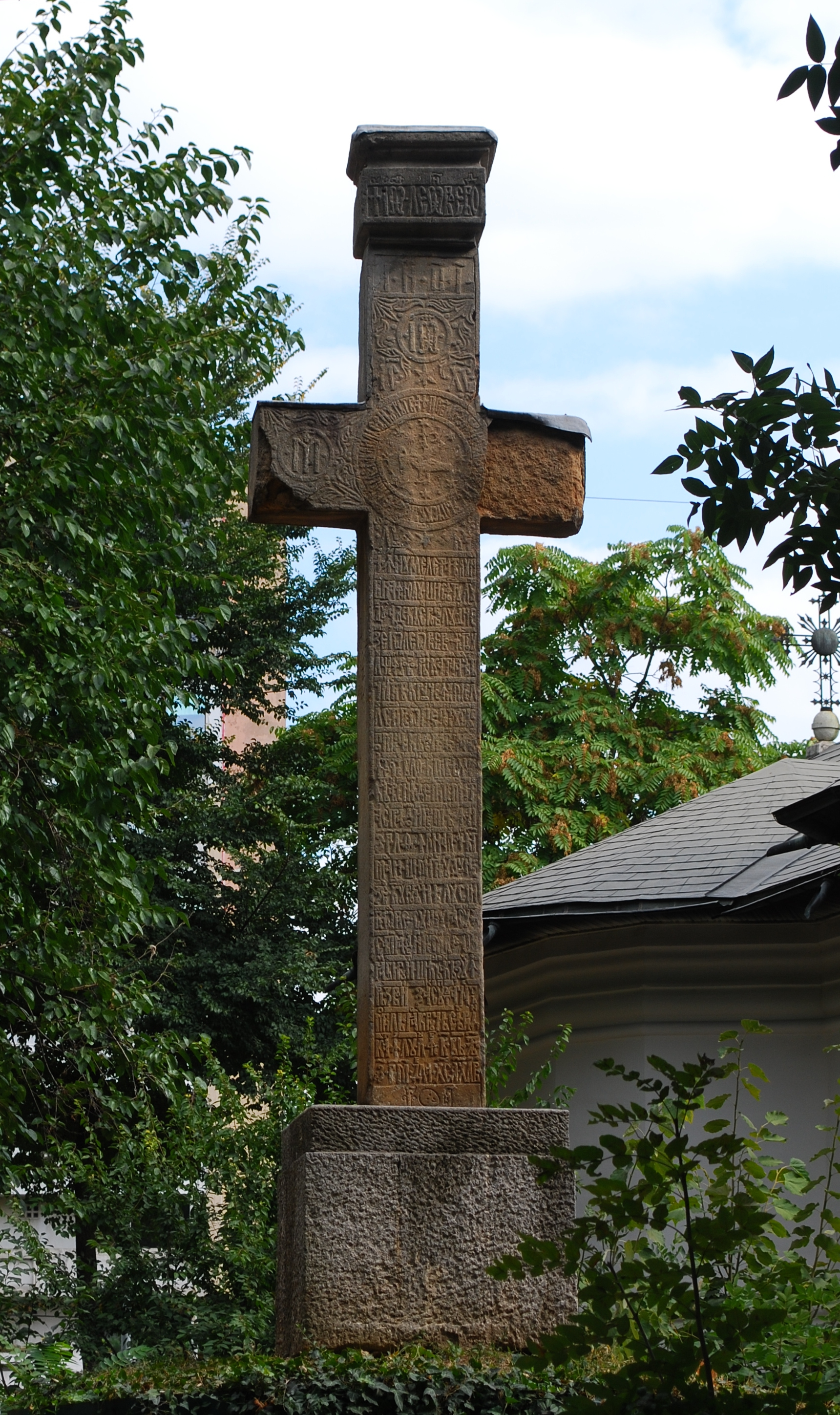
Leon's cross, as rebuilt by Radu Leon, outside Slobozia Church

Leon believed that he owed his triumph to the miraculous intervention of Saint George, to whom he dedicated a place of worship, built on the very spot of the Bucharest battle—a building currently known as Slobozia Church. According to popular tradition, the wayside cross erected there by Leon a mass grave containing people killed in the battle. In March 1632, a diplomatic mission from the Swedish Empire passed through Wallachia on its way to the Porte. Leon made a point of welcoming it to Bucharest with military honors, presenting his guard of 100 boyars and 200 Seimeni mercenaries. The delegation was headed by Paul Strassburg, and also included an Italian painter, Benedetto. Tomșa enlisted the latter's services for one or several paintings, and generously rewarded the effort.

More concessions to the peasants came in January–April. Leon unusually authorized the Hegumen of Sfânta Troiță to collect the state tax on monastery land, without the intervention of tax farmers. On his orders, one of these estates, at Parapani, only owed one ducat as tax. Additionally, Leon protected the monastery headquarters against Catargiu's illegal land encroachment, reviewing and restoring traditional property borders. His ruling is one of several period documents mentioning the overabundance of boyar watermills on the lower Dâmbovița. With one of his final contributions as reigning Prince, he also exempted Alexeanu's shops from the tax on chimneys.

Leon was ultimately deposed by the Porte since, as historian Nicolae Iorga asserts, he had been found to be an "untalented prevaricator". Zaim briefly mentions that Leon, a cultural alien, "could not get along with [his subjects]", and suggests that this was a main reason for his ouster. According to various calculations, Leon's reign ended on July 2 or July 31, 1632. An overall estimate in contemporary chronicles argues that his reign had lasted "eight days short of two and a half years". In September of that year, Greceanu, Catargiu, Dumitru Dudescu and Neagu of Strâmba led a boyar delegation to Moldavia. They demanded and obtained from Iliaș Alexandru, the Moldavian Prince, that his son, Radu Iliaș, take the throne in Bucharest. Other boyars pleaded with the Seimeni of Moldavia to join them in defending Wallachia against the foreseeable return of Aga Matei.

According to Iorga, this short-lived new regime proved widely unpopular; it is one of several reigns entirely omitted in Zaim's chronicle. It ended once Matei Basarab returned with help from Abaza and Rákóczi, entering Oltenia through its westernmost town, Orșova. Matei was instantly followed by the mass of the boyars at Radu Iliaș's court. Of this group, Mihai Coțofeanu helped the intruding force take control of Buzău; Barbu Brădescu was appointed Matei's Paharnic, commanding upon a section of his troops. Ghiorma Alexanu and Nedelco Boteanu also defected, being welcomed at Matei's court. On October 25 (November 5), at Plumbuita or Obilești, east of Bucharest, Matei won a decisive victory, and took the throne for himself. Greceanu was killed in the clashes, whereas Miho Racotă was driven into exile; Boul and Catargiu left for Moldavia, never to return.

== Legacy ==
=== In politics and culture ===
The legend of Căldărușani Monastery, recorded in 1924 by Hieromonk Damian Stănoiu, recounts that "the boyars and Redcoats and all of the country greatly rejoiced that Aga Matei had emerged as ruler of the country, for they all knew him to be a decent right-believing man, one who felt for his poor country, which had fallen prey to the Greeks of Leon Vodă". In 1633, Prince Matei passed an amnesty of the runaway serfs, but only if they had escaped before 1629. Those "settled [abroad] during the days of Leon Vodă" were to be marshaled back into their home villages. He also phased out the shepherd's tithe, paying a ransom to Rákóczi for damages encountered by Transylvanian pastoralists. Although, overall, Matei returned to increasing the taxes, the economic and fiscal crisis was surpassed with relative ease; commercially, Wallachia became reliant on the lucrative salt trade, and Ottoman fiscal demands were offset by inflation.

In other fields, Leon's legislation was also left untouched. As argued by Djuvara, the "charter" of 1631 established a pattern of boyar independence and immovability, making Princes themselves into "representatives or instruments of the grand boyars' party". Overall, according to Iordachi, a "legal regime of estates" was emerging in both Wallachia and Moldavia, with 1631 as a key moment in its evolution: "The anti-Greek campaign increased estate solidarity and the bonds between local nobles, paving the way toward the emergence of future paradigms of collective identity." Rezachevici notes that the local boyars lost interest in "anti-Greek" agitation; the revolutionary initiatives fell exclusively on Seimeni and other mercenaries, as with Hrizea of Bogdănei's rebellion. Prince Matei selectively upheld the provisions against non-naturalized Greeks. Racotă was pardoned and assigned the rank of Logothete, before being sidelined in 1640. Matei chased out Leon's Postelnic, Mano, but allowed him back into the country by 1648, without including him on the Divan.

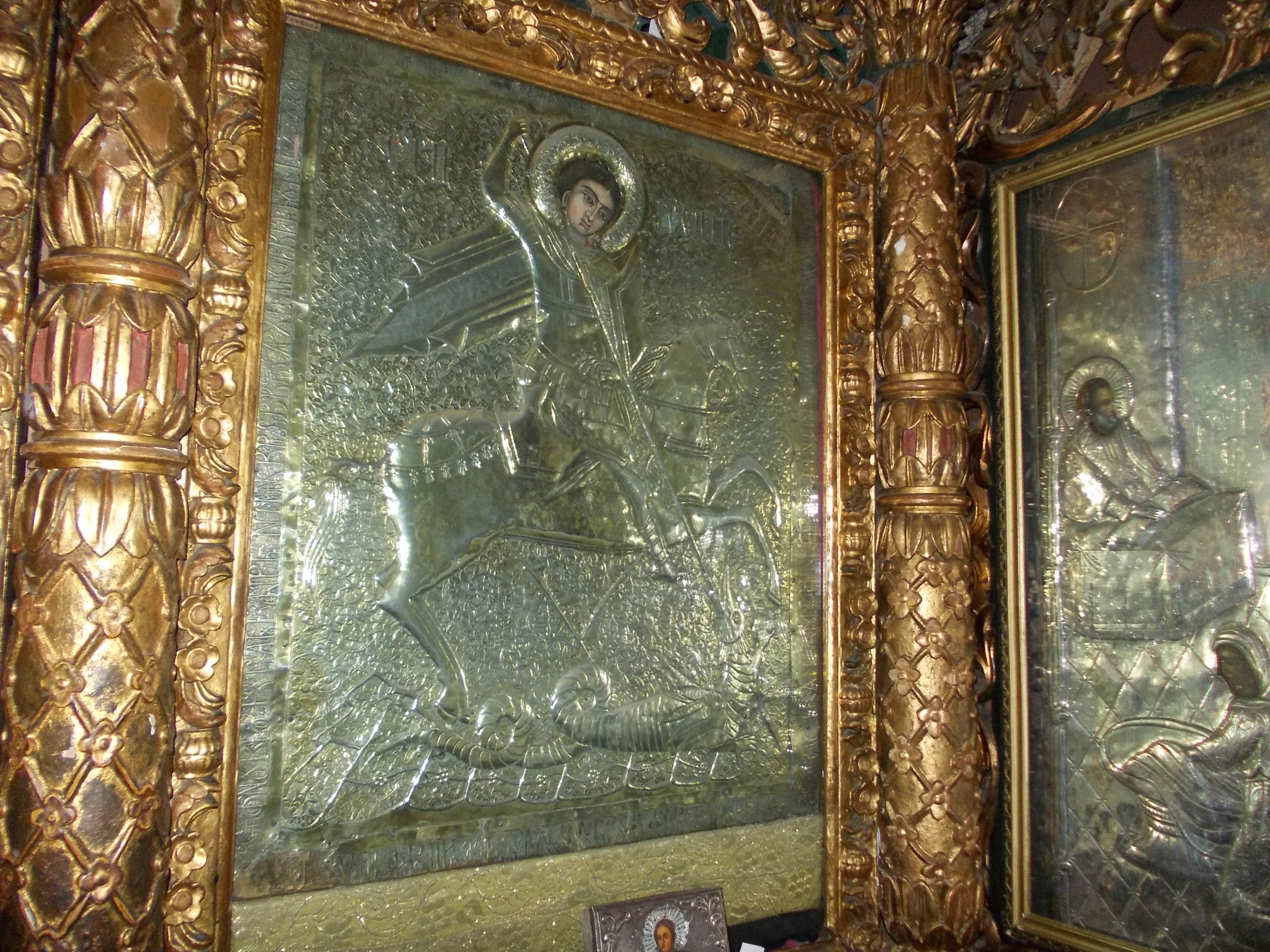
Icon of Saint George, Leon and Victoria's gift to Viforâta Monastery

As noted by Theodorescu, the Benedetto episode marked an early and isolated contribution to Western-style portrait painting in Wallachia. In addition to sponsoring this venture and erecting Slobozia's cross, Prince Leon influenced the art of Romania through his furbishing of Viforâta Monastery, which celebrated his victory at Aninoasa. In October 1631, he and Victoria donated an icon of Saint George. The few parts of the painting that are visible under the silver riza are identified as belonging to the Venetian or Veneto–Cretan School. It is reportedly the only item of the old monastery building to have survived into modernity.

As "Alion" or "Talion", the Prince became a minor character in Romanian folklore, the hero of a children's rhyme. He may also be the character "Olea", whose gun battle with "a Prince Basarabă" is caricatured in a similar poem, recorded at Ciomăgești. The Strassburg visit is also one of the early recorded instances of a monarch employing Lăutari for musical entertainment, with a repertoire of patrium carmen ("songs of the country").

=== Later "Tomșas" ===
In 1664, following an especially bloody civil war between the Cantacuzino and Băleanu boyars, the throne of Wallachia was taken by a Radu Leon. This relatively unknown figure claimed to be Prince Leon's son, but was more likely a Greek commoner; his political rise is attributable to him being a favorite of Ahmed Köprülü, the Grand Vizier. Ca. 1650, he had married Luchiana, sister of a Latin Catholic Dragoman, Michele Paradà. Like his putative father, Radu was allegedly involved in the oyster trade, and for this reason was also nicknamed Stridie or Stridigiul. In 1664–1665, he underscored his genealogical claims by restoring the cross of Slobozia.

Radu also fully re-instituted pro-Greek policies. He populated the Divan with recent immigrants such as Nicula Sofialiul and Paharnic Manolache, while preserving a major role for Leon's boyar, Balasache Muselim; he was also especially unpopular for welcoming in an unusually large number of Greek bankers. He tried to maintain a pacifying balance, assigning offices of the court to the Cantacuzinos and their various rivals. As noted by historian Petre P. Panaitescu, he managed to draw sympathies from the Băleanus. However, Radu's exorbitant spending and predatory taxing pushed Wallachia back into rebellion. During his second reign from 1664, he and his Greek boyars sparked outrage by overseeing a major confiscation of monastery assets, which included melting down silver artifacts and desecrating the relics of Saint Nicodim. His parallel involvement in the appointments of church leaders drew a warning from Dionysius, Patriarch of Constantinople.

The subsequent conflict began as a personal feud between the Prince and his Spatharios, Șerban Cantacuzino. The latter prevented his collection of revenue for the haraç, endangering Radu Leon's reign; he also launched credible rumors that Greeks were preparing a massacre of the Wallachian natives, creating a panic. The Cantacuzinos instigated another boyar conspiracy, with participants barricading themselves in the Bucharest Metropolis Church. With crucial help from the Seimeni, in late 1668 Șerban forced Radu Leon to sign a reiteration of the 1631 anti-Greek edicts. The Prince only lasted on the throne for a few more months. He refused to grant amnesty to all rebels, and was deposed, in March 1669, after renewed intrigues; most of his Greek retinue were then chased out or executed by Prince Antonie. Another wayside cross was erected in Cotroceni, its inscription reminding passers-by that Radu Leon was a "Greek prince who engaged in evil deeds and fornication".

The Prince's legacy was preserved in Moldavia: his and Luchiana's son, Beizadea Ștefan Radu, was living there after his engagement to Catrina, daughter of George Ducas. In his dedication to Zlataust Church of Iași, the Beizadea presented himself as heir to a long line of royals, probably leading back to Stephen VIII of Moldavia. Ducas attempted to dissolve the engagement after Radu Leon's downfall, claiming that Ștefan Radu was insane. The marriage did eventually take place, upon which Ducas recognized Ștefan Radu as his heir, and in 1681 dispatched him, as titular Hetman, to Right-bank Ukraine.
