= Moise of Wallachia =

Wallachian prince who died in 1530

Moise
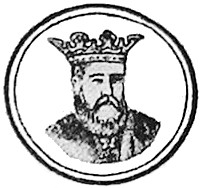
- 19th century image

Prince of Wallachia
- Reign: January 1529 – June 1530
- Predecessor: Basarab VI
- Successor: Vlad Înecatul
- Born: c. 1508
- Died: 29 August 1530
- House: Dănești
- Father: Vladislav III
- Religion: Orthodox

Moise (c. 1508 — 29 August 1530) was a Voivode (Prince) of Wallachia from January or March 1529 to June 1530, son of Vladislav III. He initially maintained a close relationship with the Ottoman Empire, and particularly with Suleiman the Magnificent, but after the Siege of Vienna, he attempted to align with the Holy Roman Empire under Ferdinand of Austria. In 1530, after being removed from his post after Vlad Înecatul was elected to replace him as prince, he was killed in battle at Viișoara, Teleorman.

== Life ==
Born son of Vladislav III about 1508, Moise rose to the throne as Voivode (Prince) of Wallachia on January or March 1529. His rule marks the willingness of the boyars to compromise, in order to prevent a rule like that of Basarab VI in which the Ottoman Empire appointed the Prince and profited from his submission.

Moise initially maintained a close relationship with Sultan Suleiman the Magnificent: on Turkish orders, he sent an embassy to Sibiu demanding that the Transylvanian city submit to Ottoman vassal Hungarian King John Zápolya; when refused, Moise's army, placed under the leadership of Seneschal Drăgan din Merişani and Neagoe din Periş (the assassins of Radu de la Afumaţi and, possibly, of Basarab V) attacked and plundered the outskirts.

After the Siege of Vienna, the Prince attempted to cut off his country's links to the Porte and align it with Ferdinand of Austria and Ferdinand's regional ally, Moldavian Prince Petru Rareş. This move was backed by the Craioveşti family, but by few other boyars. On February 13, 1530, Moise ordered the murder of several in the opposition, including Drăgan and Neagoe, during his wedding to a sister of a Craioveşti Ban; the rest took refuge in Ottoman lands and elected Vlad Înecatul as the new Prince, with Ottoman recognition. Vlad stormed the country in May, and, by early June, Moise had to take refuge in Sibiu. The officials in Poienari were sent by Vlad to ask that Moise be turned over or killed. Since he was now an ally, Sibiu refused.

On August 24, with backing from the Holy Roman Empire, Moise re-entered Wallachia through the Rucăr-Bran Passage; he was joined by Craioveşti troops at Slatina, and fought Vlad Înecatul at battle at Viişoara in Teleorman County on 29 August. He suffered a major defeat and was killed on the spot.

His daughter Zamifra was involved in the foundation of Prislop Monastery and is buried in the narthex of the church.

== See also ==
- List of princes of Wallachia

Moise of Wallachia House of Basarab; Dănești branch Born: June 1530
Regnal titles
Preceded by Basarab VI	Voivode of Wallachia; 1529–1530	Succeeded by Vlad Înecatul
