= Mihnea the Bad =

Voivode of Wallachia (1460-1510)

Voivode of Wallachia
- Reign: April 1508–October 1509
- Predecessor: Radu IV the Great
- Successor: Mircea III Dracul
- Died: 12 March 1510; Sibiu, Transylvania, Kingdom of Hungary
- Burial: Dominican church, Sibiu
- Spouse: Smaranda; Voica
- Issue: Miloș; Mircea III Dracul; Ruxandra
- House: House of Drăculești
- Father: Vlad III the Impaler
- Religion: Eastern Orthodox Church; Roman Catholic Church

Mihnea the Bad (Note: Mihnea's epithet has also been rendered in English as Mihnea the Evil, Mihnea the Wicked, and Mihnea the Wrongdoer.) (Romanian: Mihnea cel Rău; died on 12 March 1510) was voivode (prince) of Wallachia from 1508 to 1509. He was an illegitimate son of Vlad the Impaler, also known as Dracula, who ruled Wallachia on three occasions during the mid-15th century. According to hostile sources, Mihnea was the son of a minor Wallachian nobleman named Dracea, who may, however, have been his stepfather, having married his mother.

Mihnea spent some time as either a hostage or a refugee in the Ottoman Empire, but by 1483–1486 he served in the retinue of Matthias Corvinus, King of Hungary, in Buda. Between 1494 and 1498, he made several unsuccessful attempts to seize the Wallachian throne, first from his uncle, Vlad the Monk, and then from his cousin, Radu the Great, but could not secure Hungarian support. By 1508, he had returned to the Ottoman Empire, and following Radu's death in the spring of that year, he ascended the Wallachian throne with Ottoman assistance. Although his relations with Hungary were initially strained, Vladislaus II of Hungary eventually recognised him as the lawful voivode of Wallachia.

Mihnea conducted a purge of the Wallachian boyars, driving the influential Craiovești family into exile in the Ottoman Empire and destroying their Bistrița Monastery. The Craiovești subsequently persuaded the Ottomans to support a rival claimant, Vlad the Younger, prompting Mihnea to abdicate in favour of his son, Mircea III, in October 1509. Following an Ottoman invasion of Wallachia in January 1510, Mihnea and his son sought refuge in Sibiu, a Transylvanian Saxon city in the Kingdom of Hungary. Mihnea was murdered by personal enemies shortly after attending Mass at its principal church, where he was subsequently buried.

== Early life ==
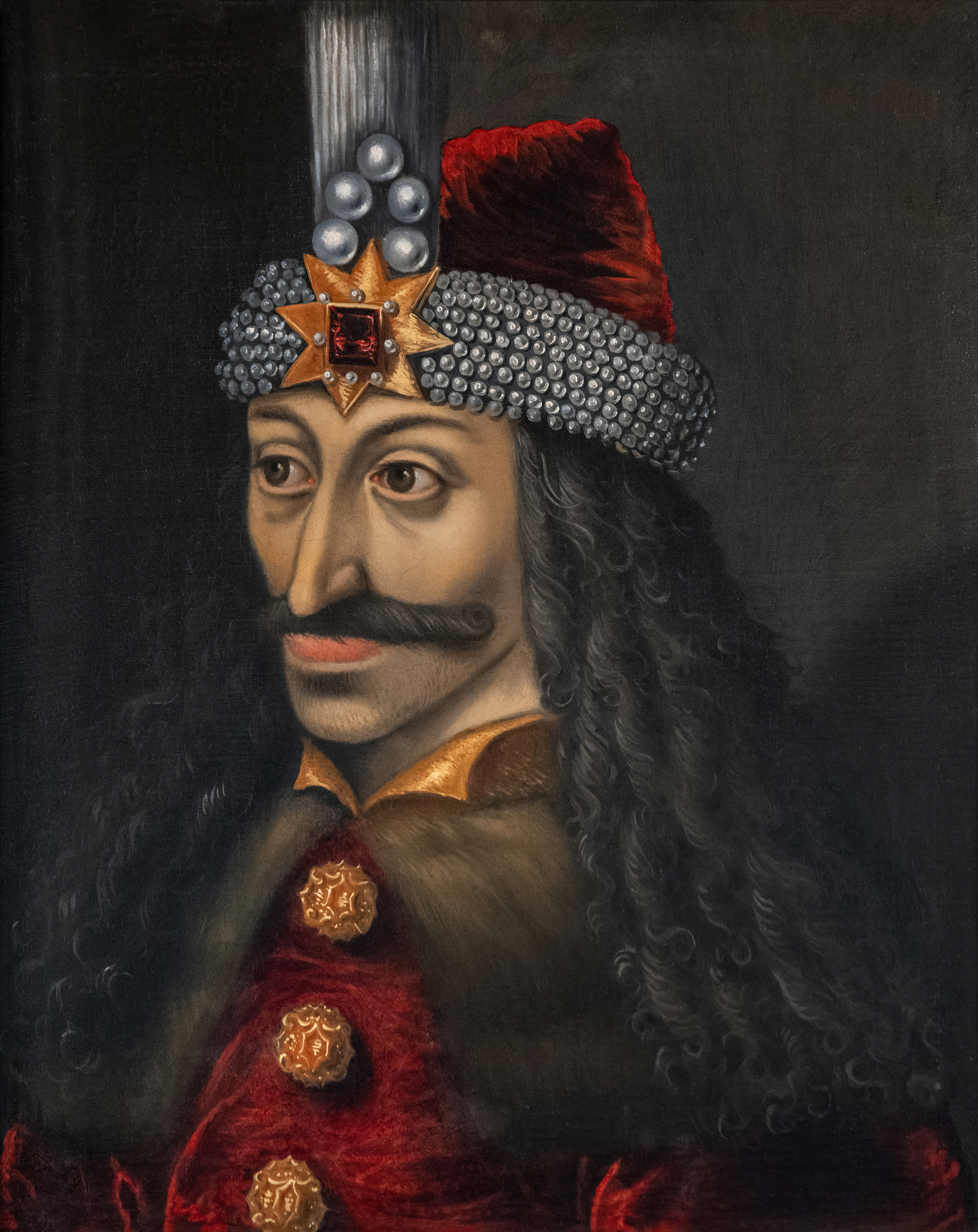
Mihnea's father, Vlad the Impaler (or Dracula), Prince of Wallachia

Born out of wedlock, Mihnea was the eldest son of Vlad the Impaler, also known as Dracula, Voivode (Prince) of Wallachia. A nearly contemporary source, The Tale of Voivode Dracula (1483–1486), refers to his mother, one of Vlad's mistresses, only as "a young woman". The same source states that Mihnea was born before his father's marriage to a kinswoman of Matthias Corvinus, King of Hungary. According to other sources, the marriage took place in February or March 1462. The Tale calls him Mihail (Michael); Mihnea is a diminutive form of the same name. He had two younger legitimate brothers, Vlad and another whom the historian Matei Cazacu tentatively identifies as Mircea.

Mihnea was a member of the Basarab dynasty, which had ruled Wallachia since the early fourteenth century. He belonged to the Drăculești branch of the dynasty, named after his grandfather, Vlad Dracul ("Vlad the Dragon"). (Note: Vlad Dracul acquired his epithet upon his admission to the Order of the Dragon by Sigismund of Luxembourg, King of Hungary, in 1431.) The kings of Hungary claimed the allegiance of the voivodes of Wallachia, but from 1417 the latter also paid tribute to the Ottoman sultans. Rivalry between Hungary and the Ottoman Empire, together with divisions within the Wallachian nobility, contributed to frequent disputes over the succession, particularly because any male member of the dynasty, whether legitimate or illegitimate, was eligible to claim the throne.

A nearly contemporary source, though hostile to Mihnea, the Life of Saint Niphon (1520–1521), identifies him as the "son of Dracea, the armaș". (Note: The office of armaș was generally held by members of the lesser nobility, whose responsibilities included the enforcement of voivodal sentences and, from at least the reign of Vlad the Impaler, the supervision of public executions.) Later sources, likewise critical of him, including the Cantacuzino Chronicle, also describe Mihnea as Dracea's son; some versions of the chronicle refer more specifically to Dracea as "the armaș of Mănești", thereby associating him with a village on the Colentina River that was held by Mihnea's descendants by the late 16th century and is now part of Buftea. According to the historian Constantin Rezachevici, Mihnea's mother was given in marriage to Dracea by Vlad the Impaler, making Dracea Mihnea's stepfather.

After a brief reign as voivode of Wallachia in 1448, Vlad the Impaler regained the throne in 1456 following the Hungarian victory over the Ottoman sultan Mehmed II at the Siege of Belgrade. To avert an Ottoman invasion, Vlad agreed to pay an annual tribute of 10,000 ducats. On the basis of a reference to Mihnea's presence in the Ottoman Empire in The Tale, the historian Matei Cazacu suggests that Vlad sent his son to the Ottomans as a hostage between 1456 and 1458. Vlad restricted the privileges of Transylvanian Saxon merchants, conducted a purge of the Wallachian boyars, and ceased paying tribute to the Ottoman Empire, thereby worsening his relations with both neighbouring powers and the local nobility. In 1462, the Ottomans invaded Wallachia in support of a rival claimant, Vlad's brother Radu the Fair, forcing Vlad to seek assistance from Hungary. Matthias Corvinus, however, ordered his arrest on charges of treason. According to Rezachevici, Mihnea accompanied his father from Wallachia to Hungary, whereas Cazacu maintains that he fled to Hungary from the Ottomans.

Vlad and his family, including his wife, their sons and Mihnea, remained under house arrest in Pest until their release by Corvinus in 1475. With Hungarian support, Vlad once again regained the Wallachian throne in late 1476, but was killed shortly afterwards, either by partisans of the Ottoman-backed claimant Basarab Laiotă or by his own men. In Rezachevici's view, Mihnea's stay in the Ottoman Empire, mentioned in The Tale, occurred after his father's death, when he went to Ottoman territory accompanied by Wallachian boyars. By the time The Tale was compiled, Mihnea was already residing at Corvinus's court in Buda, and must therefore have left the Ottoman Empire beforehand.

== Claimant ==
After settling in Buda, Mihnea served in Matthias Corvinus's retinue alongside his surviving legitimate brother Vlad, their other brother having died earlier. According to Rezachevici, Mihnea moved alone to the Transylvanian Saxon city of Sibiu shortly after arriving in Hungary, whereas Cazacu suggests that Mihnea and Vlad probably settled there together following Corvinus's death in 1490. By this time, Wallachia was ruled by their uncle, Vlad the Monk, an illegitimate brother of Vlad the Impaler. The earliest documented evidence of Mihnea's bid for the Wallachian throne is a letter he addressed to Wallachian boyars before 1 July 1494, seeking to win their support. The letters were delivered to Wallachia by envoys, one of whom was captured and had his nose cut off.

Following Vlad the Monk's death in 1495, Mihnea's legitimate brother Vlad made the first attempt to seize the Wallachian throne from their cousin, Radu the Great, but was defeated. Vladislaus II Jagiellon, Corvinus's successor as king of Hungary, reprimanded him for his incursion into Wallachia, and Vlad died shortly afterwards. Mihnea continued to launch raids into Wallachia, prompting Radu to close the roads from Transylvania in 1495 and 1498. Radu sent envoys to Vladislaus, who subsequently forbade the Saxons of Sibiu from supporting Mihnea and ordered them to prevent him from launching raids into Wallachia. Mihnea's activities over the following years are undocumented, but he reappears in the historical record in 1508 as a protégé of Mehmed Bey Mihaloğlu, the Ottoman governor of Nicopolis, whose mother was a Wallachian noblewoman. His decision to turn to the Ottomans was obviously prompted by the Hungarians' refusal to support his claim to the Wallachian throne, according to Cazacu.

== Rule ==
Radu the Great died shortly after Easter (23 April) 1508, following a serious illness. Vladislaus II of Hungary had already taken steps to prevent the accession of an Ottoman-backed claimant. As early as March, he had instructed Józsa Som, Captain-General of the royal troops in southern Hungary, to invade Wallachia in the event of Radu's death, and ordered the Transylvanian Saxons to support the campaign. Danciul, a member of the Dănești branch of the Basarab dynasty, was Vladislaus's candidate for the Wallachian throne. He was then residing with the Hungarian magnate John Zápolya, whom Vladislaus had instructed, along with other magnates, to support his claim.

Ruins of the Poenari Castle: Mihnea seized it by force in 1508.

Meanwhile, soon after Radu's death, Mihnea crossed the Danube from Ottoman territory into Wallachia, accompanied by Ottoman troops, and occupied Târgoviște and Poenari Castle. In a letter dated 5 June 1508, he informed the Saxons of Sibiu that he had gained control of all the fortresses in Wallachia and secured the allegiance of the Wallachian boyars. He further assured them that he intended to maintain peaceful relations with Hungary and to defend it against Ottoman incursions. The historian Alexandru Lapedatu attributes Mihnea's desire for a rapprochement with Hungary to his fear of a Hungarian invasion.

Mihnea initially approached the Transylvanian Saxons of Sibiu and Brașov, but the latter closed the roads leading to Wallachia. He subsequently wrote to Vladislaus, pledging his loyalty to the king despite having secured the Wallachian throne with Ottoman assistance. Seeking to avoid an open conflict with the Ottomans, Vladislaus adopted a conciliatory stance and entered into negotiations with Mihnea through the mediation of Péter Szentgyörgyi, Voivode (royal governor) of Transylvania. Mihnea was represented in the negotiations by two officials, one of whom was Albul the Treasurer. Although the roads to Wallachia were subsequently reopened, mutual distrust persisted. Upon receiving false reports that Ottoman and Wallachian forces were assembling for an invasion of Transylvania, Szentgyörgyi denounced Mihnea as "a public enemy of the Holy Crown [of Hungary]" in April 1509.

To consolidate his authority, Mihnea pursued a policy of repression against the Wallachian boyars from late 1508, ordering the arrest, torture and execution of numerous members of the nobility. The Cantacuzino Chronicle also accuses him of raping the wives and daughters of captive boyars in their presence. Mihnea further sought to eliminate the powerful Craiovești family, (Note: First attested in the 1430s, the Craiovești had become the largest landowners in Wallachia by the end of the century, possessing more than 130 estates.) but they fled to the Ottoman Empire. In retaliation, he ordered the seizure and burning of their estates and the destruction of Bistrița Monastery, which the family had founded. Maxim, Metropolitan of Wallachia, also came into conflict with Mihnea. According to Maxim's later hagiography, he subsequently offered to lead an embassy to Hungary, where Vladislaus eventually recognised Mihnea as the lawful voivode of Wallachia. By late July 1509, Mihnea had travelled to Brașov in person to order silver items from Saxon craftsmen. In mid-August, Peter Wolff and Peter Hoch concluded a treaty with Mihnea on behalf of the Transylvanian Saxon community. Mihnea also engaged in the sale of pigs to the Saxons of Sibiu through Wallachian middlemen.

At the instigation of the Craiovești family, the Ottoman sultan appointed Vlad the Younger, brother of Radu the Great, as voivode of Wallachia. In response, Mihnea abdicated in favour of his son, Mircea, in October 1509. The earliest surviving charter issued by Mircea III in his capacity as voivode is dated 29 October 1509. In January 1510, however, Mehmed Bey Mihaloğlu invaded Wallachia, forcing Mihnea to seek refuge in Hungary the following month. Mircea attempted to resist the invasion at Argeș but was soon compelled to follow his father into exile.

== Death ==
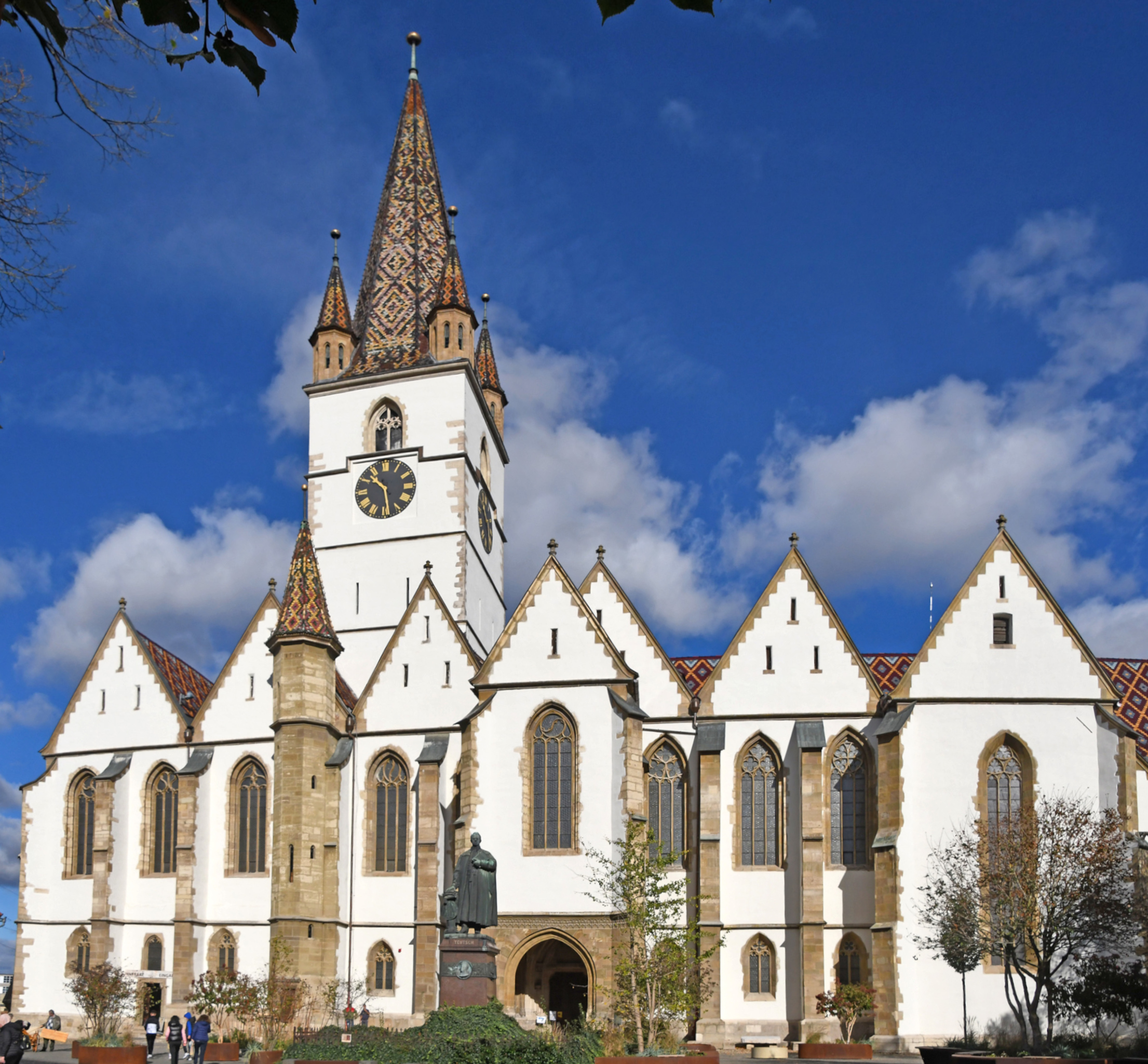
The Dominican church in Sibiu (now the city's Evangelical cathedral), where Mihnea attended Mass shortly before his assassination.

Mihnea settled in Sibiu with the authorisation of the Voivode of Transylvania. A convert to Catholicism, Mihnea regularly attended Mass at the Dominican church (now the city's Evangelical cathedral). Several of Mihnea's enemies had also settled in Sibiu. Among them were Danciul, who had not relinquished his claim to the Wallachian throne, and Albul the Treasurer, who had deserted Mihnea for reasons that remain unknown. Another prominent opponent was Demetrius Jakšić, whose sister had married a nephew of Radu the Great, thereby establishing a family connection with Mihnea's adversaries. Jakšić bore a particular grudge against Mihnea, who had raped his sister and killed his son-in-law.

Upon his arrival in Sibiu, Mihnea obtained a safe-conduct from the municipal authorities, who also ordered his enemies to refrain from attacking him. Despite this, Jakšić hired thirty-two footmen and on 12 March 1510 they attacked Mihnea on the Small Square while he was leaving the Dominicans' church accompanied only by one of his kinsmen, Stephen Olahus, because his son, Mircea had the previous day left Sibiu to accompany the Voivode of Transylvania. Mihnea was unarmed and was killed by sword blows near the city's largest church. His death was shortly avenged by the townspeople and Mircea, who returned to the city. They killed the assailants; Danciul was reportedly slain by Mircea himself. Mihnea was buried in the crypt of the Dominican church beneath a marble tombstone that survives to this day. According to Wallachian chronicles, a portrait of him was painted on a wall at the site of his murder and remained visible into the eighteenth century.

== Family ==
Mihnea married twice. His first wife, Maria or Smaranda, died before 1485, while his second wife, Voica, survived him. Following his death, Vladislaus II of Hungary placed Voica and Mihnea's children under his protection. One of Mihnea's sons, Miloş, was held hostage in Constantinople when his father invaded Wallachia to claim the throne in 1508. He died in 1519. Mihnea's other son, Mircea III, made two unsuccessful attempts to regain the Wallachian throne; the date of his death is unknown. According to the historian George D. Florescu, Miloş was born between c. 1480 and 1490, while Mircea between c. 1485 and 1490, both to Mihnea's first wife. Mihnea's only known daughter, Ruxandra, was born to his second wife. She married the Wallachian boyar Drahomir in 1511 and, three years later, Bogdan the One-Eyed, Voivode of Moldavia.

== Legacy ==
Mihnea's epithet—"the Bad"—was coined by supporters of the rival Craiovești faction. As late as 12 September 1683, the mare spătar ("great sword-bearer") Constantin Brâncoveanu, a descendant of the Craiovești family, commissioned an inscription at the recently restored Bistrița Monastery denouncing "the wicked enmity of the cruel Mihnea Voivode Dracea", who had attempted to raze the monastery to the ground by cannon fire. In his novel Mihnea Vodă cel Rău (1857), the Romantic writer Alexandru Odobescu portrays Mihnea as the archetypal Oriental despot.

Mihnea's grandson, Alexander II Mircea, became voivode of Wallachia in 1568. Nine years later, he granted the village of Mănești to the newly built metropolitan church in Bucharest. In the deed of grant, he described Mănești as part of his patrimony inherited from Mihnea, suggesting that Mihnea had himself inherited the village from his stepfather. Mihnea's patrilineal descendants, known as the Mihnești, ruled Wallachia and Moldavia on several occasions. The line came to an end in 1630 with Alexander Mircea's great-grandson, Alexander the Child. Mihnea's descendants include members of the Cantacuzino family, through the marriage of his granddaughter Maria to Michael Cantacuzino, known as Şeytanoğlu ("Son of the Devil"). The family became a prominent Phanariot dynasty, claiming descent from the Byzantine imperial Kantakouzenos family, and rose to prominence in Wallachia in the late 16th century.

== Sources ==
- Antofi, Simona (2018). "Eugen Simion, Alexandru Odobescu – The Monograph of a Wallachian Intellectual" (PDF). Journal of Romanian Literary Studies (in Romanian) (15). ALPHA Institute for Multicultural Studies, Arhipelag XXI Press: 23–28. ISSN 2248-3004.
- Cazacu, Matei (2017). Dracula. BRILL. ISBN 978-90-04-34725-0.
- Coman, Marian; Cristea, Ovidiu (2026). "Communities of Wallachia (Mid-14th to Mid-16th Centuries)". In Cristea, Ovidiu; Curta, Florin (eds.). A Companion to the History of Wallachia up to 1859. Brill's Companions to European History. Vol. 34. BRILL. pp. 56–81. ISBN 978-90-04-76481-1.
- Florescu, George D. (1991). "Appendix I: A Genealogy of the Family of Vlad Țepeș". In Treptow, Kurt W. (ed.). Dracula: Essays on the Life and Times of Vlad Țepeș. East European Monographs. Vol. 1833. Columbia University Press. pp. 249–252. ISBN 978-0-88033-220-0.
- Florescu, Radu R.; McNally, Raymond T. (1989). Dracula, Prince of Many Faces: His Life and his Times. Back Bay Books. ISBN 978-0-316-28656-5.
- Ilie, Liviu Marius (2026). "Landlords and Peasants (16th to 17th Centuries)". In Cristea, Ovidiu; Curta, Florin (eds.). A Companion to the History of Wallachia up to 1859. Brill's Companions to European History. Vol. 34. BRILL. pp. 126–145. ISBN 978-90-04-76481-1.
- Lapedatu, Alexandru (1921–1922). "Mihnea cel Rău și ungurii, 1508-1510" [Mihnea the Bad and the Hungarians, 1508-1510]. Anuarul Institutului de Istorie Națională (in Romanian). 1. Institutul de Arte Grafice "Ardealul": 46–76.
- Lupu, Ramona Neacsa; Vilciu, Marian (2017). "Use Of Violence Against Bistriţa Monastery: Political Discourse in 16th-century Walachia". In Sandu, Antonio; Ciulei, Tomita; Frunza, Ana (eds.). Multidimensional Education and Professional Development: Ethical Values. Vol. 27. Future Academy. pp. 473–477. doi:10.15405/epsbs.2017.07.03.56. ISBN 978-1-80296-026-6.
- Popovici, Teodora; Negrău, Elisabeta (2025). "A Lost Mural Painting: Đorđe Branković's Description of the Portraits of Lady Despina and Metropolitan Maksim at Bistrița Monastery". Museikon. 9. Muzeul Național al Unirii (Alba Iulia); Interactions Culturelles et Discursives, Université de Tours; Centre d'Études Supérieures de Civilisation Médiévale: 45–61. ISSN 2601-2200.
- Pop, Ioan-Aurel (2005). "Romanians in the 14th–16th Centuries: From the "Christian Republic" to the "Restoration of Dacia"". In Pop, Ioan-Aurel; Bolovan, Ioan (eds.). History of Romania: Compendium. Romanian Cultural Institute (Center for Transylvanian Studies). pp. 209–314. ISBN 978-973-7784-12-4.
- Rezachevici, Constantin (2001). Cronologia critică a domnilor din Țara Românească și Moldova: a. 1324-1881 [A Critical Chronology of the Rulers of Wallachia and Moldavia, 1324–1881] (in Romanian). Vol. I. Editura Enciclopedică. ISBN 978-973-45-0387-2.
- Rezachevici, Constantin (2005). "Dracea armașul din Mănești, soțul mamei lui Mihnea cel Rău, fiul nelegitim al lui Vlad Țepeș, și moștenirea lăsată de acesta Mihneștilor" [Dracea, the Armaș of Mănești, Husband of the Mother of Mihnea the Bad, Vlad the Impaler's Illegitimate Son, and the Inheritance He Left to the Mihnești]. Argesis. Studii și Comunicări. Istorie (in Romanian). XIV. Muzeul Județean Argeș: 315–332. ISSN 1453-2182.

Mihnea the Bad House of Drăculești Died: 1510
Regnal titles
| Preceded by Radu IV the Great | Voivode of Wallachia; 1508–1509 | Succeeded by Mircea III Dracul |
