= Mircea III Dracul =

- Voivode of Wallachia
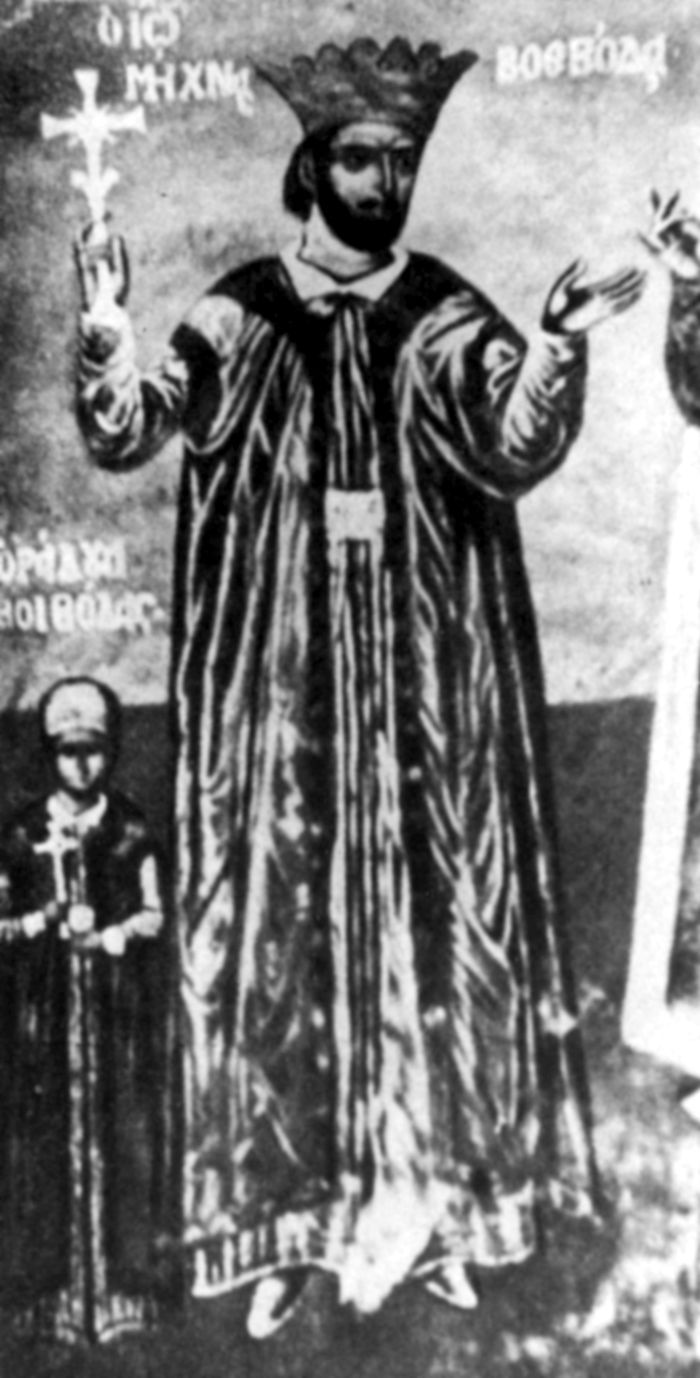
- Young Mircea and his father, Mihnea cel Rău

Voivode of Wallachia
- Reign: 12 October 1509 – 26 January 1510
- Predecessor: Mihnea cel Rău
- Successor: Vlad cel Tânăr
- Born: Unknown
- Died: 1534; Eastern Hungarian Kingdom
- Spouse: Doamna Maria Despina of Serbia
- Issue: Alexander II Mircea; Peter the Lame; Miloș; Mircea
- House: House of Drăculești
- Father: Mihnea cel Rău
- Mother: Doamna Voica of Izvorani
- Religion: Eastern Orthodox Church

Mircea III Dracul (died 1534) was one of the two sons of Mihnea cel Rău, making him the grandson of Vlad Dracula. He ruled as prince of Wallachia between 12 October 1509 and 26 January 1510.

== Reign ==
After Vlad cel Tânăr, gained support for his claim on the throne of Wallachia from the Ottomans with the help of the Craiovești family, Mihnea cel Rău ceded the throne to his son, Mircea, on 12 October 1509. Although in the older Romanian historiography it was thought that Mircea only co-ruled with his father, this was proven false by the documents he issued. The first documents issued by Mircea were recorded from 29 October, signed with "Io Mircea voievod, din mila lui Dumnezeu, domn" ("Io Mircea voivode, by God's mercy, lord").

Due to his anti-Ottoman views, Emperor Maximilian I sent him a gift in the form of a mail cap and shirt covered with gold cloth and velvet, and decorated with several sapphires and garnets, in the hopes of securing an alliance with "the Great Wallachian", as he referred to Mircea. Mircea left Wallachia around 26 January 1510, after a battle near Cotmeana with an Ottoman army led by Neagoe, the former great postelnic. Mircea eventually met with his father in Sibiu. Together with his soldiers, he accompanied the Voivode of Transylvania to Slimnic on 11 March. Following the assassination of his father, he took part in catching the assassins. Mircea himself managed to kill one of the assassins, Danciu Țepeluș, a son of Basarab Țepeluș.

== Attempts to retake the throne ==
Entering the protection of Vladislaus II of Hungary, he tried to gain support for recovering the throne. With an army of Székelys, he launched a campaign in January 1511, being defeated however in a battle at Gherghița. According to a version of the internal chronicle, he fled to Constantinople following this defeat. In the summer of 1512, during the reign of Neagoe Basarab, he launched another campaign with support from Transylvania, but was once again defeated. The last information about him comes from 1514, when he asked the saxons from Brașov to deliver his weapons left there by John Zápolya to his residence in Cetatea de Baltă (at that time owned by Bogdan III of Moldavia), and requested assistance in fighting the Turks. In 1521, a false venetian story saying that he managed to take the throne from Teodosie with help from Mehmed bei of Nicopolis circulated in Budapest.

== Death and legacy ==
He died in 1534, and it is unknown where he was buried. He was married to Doamna Despina and had four sons: Alexander II Mircea, Peter the Lame, Miloș Vodă and Mircea, as well as four daughters.

== Bibliography ==
- Rezachevici, Constantin (2001). Cronologia critica a domnilor din Țara Româneasca și Moldova: a. 1324 - 1881 (in Romanian). Vol. I: Secolele XIV - XVI. Bucharest: Editura Enciclopedică.

Mircea III Dracul House of Drăculești Died: 1510
Regnal titles
Preceded by Mihnea cel Rău	Voivode of Wallachia; 1509–1510	Succeeded by Vlad al V-lea cel Tânăr
