= Grigore Brâncoveanu =

Ruler of Wallachia in 1818

- caimacam
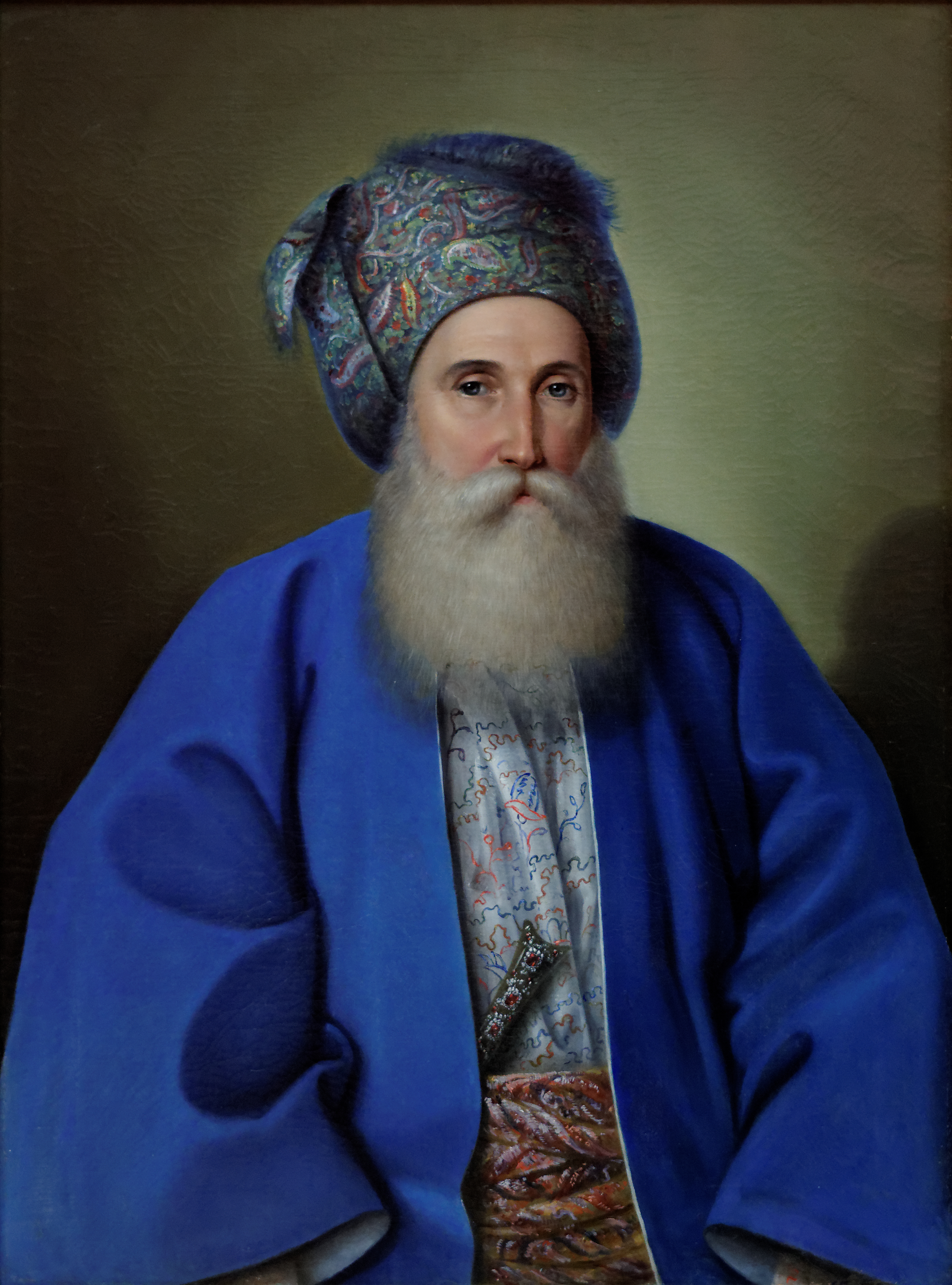
- Born: 1767
- Died: April 27 1832
- Spouse: Elizabeta 'Safta' Balș
- Issue: Zoe Mavrocordato (adopted)
- House: Brâncoveanu
- Father: Emanoil Brâncoveanu
- Mother: Zoe 'Zoița' Sturdza

Grigore Brâncoveanu was a Caimacam and ruler of Wallachia in 1818.

== Biography ==
Born into the branch of an old Romanian House of Craiovești, as the son of Prince Emanoil Brâncoveanu (1750-1811) and his wife, Princess Zoe 'Zoița' Sturdza (b. 1753). In 1793, he married Elisabeta Balș (d. 1857).

Although the marriage remained childless, the pair adopted Elisabeta's niece, Princess Zoe Mavrocordato (1805-1892), who was scheduled to marry Grigore's distant cousin, Gheorghe Bibescu from Oltenia. In the early 1840s, Zoe turns out to be mentally imbalanced and the couple eventually divorced.
