= Bistrița Monastery (disambiguation) =

Bistrița Monastery may refer to two Romanian Orthodox monasteries:

- Bistrița Monastery (Neamț)
- Bistrița Monastery (Vâlcea)
