= Alion =

Alion may refer to any of the following:

- Leon Tomșa, Prince of Wallachia
- Ion Buzdugan, Romanian writer
- Alión, a Spanish winery
- Alion Science and Technology, a defense contractor
