= Slobozia Church =

Heritage site in Bucharest, Romania

Coordinates: 44°25′18″N 26°6′12″E

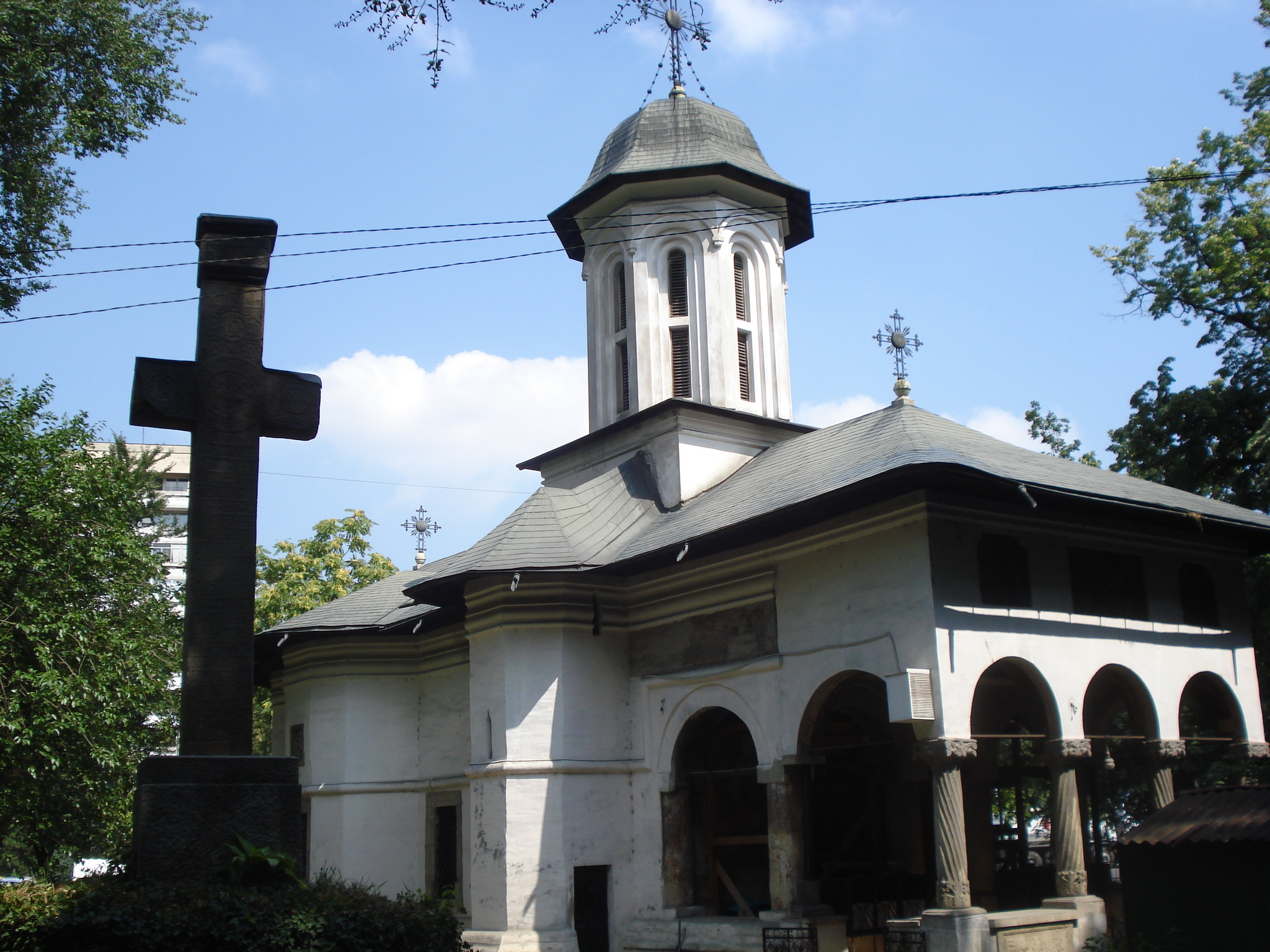
Slobozia Church

Slobozia Church (Romanian: Biserica Slobozia), dedicated to the Great Martyr St. Demetrius (Sf. Mare Mucenic Dumitru), is a Romanian Orthodox church in Bucharest's Sector 4, located at the intersection of Dimitrie Cantemir and Marășești Boulevards. Built by Radu Leon, its ctitor, between 1664 and 1667, the church was erected near a stone cross placed by Radu's father, Leon Tomșa.

The cross was built between 1629 and 1632 in order to commemorate the victory Leon Tomșa's army had won on August 23, 1631 against the boyars of Aga Matei (the future Matei Basarab). The cross stands on a small circular mound, where the bones of Leon Tomșa's troops are buried, as well as those of his enemy. Between 1664 and 1665 Radu Leon restored the cross, providing it with a brick shelter, now lost.

After renovating the cross, Radu Leon built Slobozia Church. Initially constructed on a rectangular plan, the church was rebuilt, enlarged and rounded in 1743 by vistier (treasurer) Constantin Năsturel Herescu.

During the 19th and 20th centuries, the church underwent a series of important modifications, so that its original style acquired a classical look. Among these changes was the replacement of the interior walls with large arches; the façades also acquired classical elements.

The interior murals have also changed through time, the most important new features being introduced around the time of the Wallachian Revolution of 1848, a period when Western trends were combined with native elements. During construction work of the Bucharest Metro, the altar was cracked in April or May 1986, leading to the filling of the said tunnel with sand, and subsequent repairs to the altar.
