= Vlad VI Înecatul =

- Voivode of Wallachia
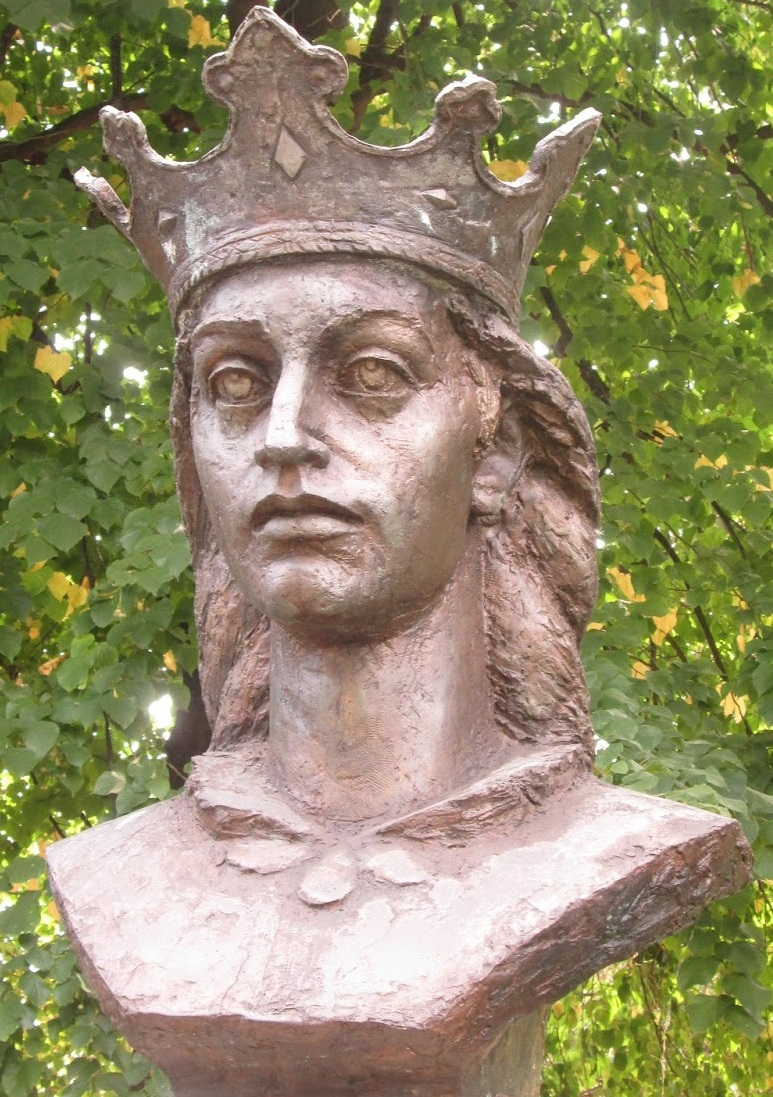

Voivode of Wallachia
- Reign: 4 June 1530 – September 1532
- Predecessor: Moise of Wallachia
- Successor: Vlad Vintilă de la Slatina
- Born: c. 1508
- Died: September 1532
- Spouse: Anna of Moldavia
- House: Drăculești
- Dynasty: Basarab
- Father: Vlad cel Tânăr
- Mother: Lady Anca

Vlad VI of Wallachia (c. 1508 – September 1532) was the voivode (prince) who ruled Wallachia between June 1530 and September 1532. He has been historically referenced as Vlad Înecatul ("Vlad the Drowned"), as a description of the manner of his death.

One of three (along with Moldavia and Transylvania) primary historic and geographic regions of Romania, Wallachia was founded as a principality in the early 14th century by Basarab I but, by 1417, had accepted the suzerainty of the Ottoman Empire, albeit with considerable self-rule. Descendants of the House of Basarab continued to rule Wallachia and, as recounted in surviving records from the time of Mihnea Turcitul (the young voivode in 1577–83 and 1585–91), the chronology of a century earlier indicates that the grandfather of Vlad VI, Vlad IV Călugărul [Vlad the Monk] was voivode from 1481 until his death in 1495. His son Vlad cel Tânăr [Vlad V, the Younger] (ca. 1488–1512) became voivode in 1510, at the age of about 22 and, less than two years later, was captured following a defeat at the Battle of Bucharest and executed.

Although no specific historical documentation of his birth remains, the son of Vlad the Younger was about four years old at the time of his father's death. He became voivode at about the same age as his father, 22, in the aftermath of his predecessor Moise's rebellion against the Ottomans, but was immediately contested by Moise himself and the Craiovești boyar family. On 29 August 1530, at the Battle of Viișoara, Vlad VI defeated Moise who died in combat. In October, after a further unsuccessful rebellion of the Oltenian nobility led by Craiovești pretender to the throne Drăghici Gogoașă, who was subsequently executed in Constantinople, Vlad ended Craiovești's line of succession to the Banate of Craiova.

In his two years as voivode, Vlad is noted as having effected the construction of Dâmbovița County's famed Viforâta Monastery, in Aninoasa. His life was cut short at about the same age as that of his father, 24, and the historical detail behind his posthumous cognomen is described in the contemporary text of Adolf Armbruster (Dacoromano-Saxonica, p. 198). The account indicates that, following a prolonged banquet, at which, as customary, large quantities of alcoholic beverages were served, Vlad mounted his horse for a ride in the direction of Dâmbovița River in which, near the village of Popești, south of Bucharest, he drowned. His burial at the Deal Monastery was arranged by his mother.

Vlad V cel Tânăr House of Basarab; Drăculești branch Born: 1508 Died: September 1532
Regnal titles
Preceded by Moise	Voivode of Wallachia; 1530–1532	Succeeded by Vlad Vintilă de la Slatina
