= Basarab VI =

Prince of Wallachia
- Reign: 6 January 1529 – 5 February 1529
- Predecessor: Radu of Afumați
- Successor: Moise of Wallachia
- Born: unknown
- Died: 1529
- Father: Mehmed-bey
- Religion: Orthodox

Basarab VI (? – 1529) was the son of the usurper Mehmed-bey who ruled Wallachia briefly in 1529 after the death of Radu of Afumati.

Basarab VI Died: 1529
Regnal titles
Preceded by Radu of Afumați	Voivode of Wallachia; 1529	Succeeded by Moise
