= Vlad cel Tânăr =

Vlad V cel Tânăr
- Voivode of Wallachia

Voivode of Wallachia
- Reign: 8 April 1510 – 23 January 1512
- Predecessor: Mircea III Dracul
- Successor: Neagoe Basarab
- Born: 1488
- Died: 23 January 1512 (aged 24); Bucharest, Principality of Wallachia
- Burial: Dealu Monastery, Dâmbovița County
- Spouse: Doamna Anca
- Issue: Vlad VI Înecatul; Dragoșina of Wallachia
- House: House of Drăculești
- Father: Vlad Călugărul
- Mother: Doamna Maria Palaiologina
- Religion: Eastern Orthodox Church

Vlad V cel Tânăr (Vlad V the Younger or "Vladuț"; 1488 – 23 January 1512) was the Prince of Wallachia (1510–1512). He took the throne from Mircea III Dracul on 8 April 1510 with the help of the Ottomans and with the support of the Craiovești family. In exchange, the prince vowed protection to Mehmet and his family and Parvu Craiovescu, a member of the Craiovești family, became the head of the Divan of Wallachia. Parvu was then followed by Danciu and in 1511, by Bogdan, the Prince's brother-in-law.

On 17 August 1511, Vlad signed the treaty with Vladislaus II of Hungary, in which he swore allegiance to the crown. At the time, the head of the Divan was Bogdan, and not the Craiovești family, which although it caused anger to the boyars, still remained faithful to the Prince.

The Craiovești proved their faithfulness on 28 November when, they helped repel Mircea, son of Mihnea take over the throne using the Magyar army at Gherghița. However, after November, Vlad and the Craiovești family had developed a falling out. The boyars, accustomed to being in the head of the state, were envious of Bogdan's authority. Moreover, Vlad suspected Neagoe, the son of Parvu Craiovescu, of wanting to become the Prince of Wallachia. As a result, the boyars deserted Vlad and crossed the Danube to Mehmet. With his help, the Ottoman army and the Craiovești pretender started marching to Bucharest. At Văcărești, the battle was lost for Vlad and he was taken prisoner.

On 23 January 1512, Vlad V cel Tânăr was decapitated under a pear tree in Bucharest.

Vlad V cel Tânăr House of Basarab; Drăculești branch Born: 1494 Died: 23 January 1512
Regnal titles
Preceded by Mircea III	Voivode of Wallachia; 1510–1512	Succeeded by Neagoe Basarab V
Notes and references
1. Regnal Chronologies
