= Argeș =

Arges or Argeș may refer to:

== Places and jurisdictions ==
=== Romania ===
- Argeș County, a county in Muntenia, with its capital at Pitești
- Argeș Region, an administrative division from 1950 to 1952
- Argeș River, which flows through the Southern Carpathians into the Danube at Oltenița
- Curtea de Argeș, a city of Muntenia in the lower Carpathians; it is/was the archepiscopal see of :
- Archdiocese of Argeș and Muscel, a diocese of the Romanian Orthodox Church
- Albeștii de Argeș, a commune in Argeș County
- Poienarii de Argeș, a commune in Argeș County
- Ținutul Argeș, an administrative division from 1938 to 1940

=== Iran ===
- Arges-e Olya, a village in Hamadan Province, Iran
- Arges-e Sofla, a village in Hamadan Province, Iran

== Other uses ==
- A Kurdish male name
- Arges (Cyclops), also called Acmonides or Pyraemonone, one of the cyclopes in Greek mythology
- Argeș (flamethrower)
- Arges project, a research project in the field of metal-halide lamps
- FC Argeș Pitești, a Romanian Liga I football club
- Constantin Dobrescu-Argeș, Romanian politician

== See also ==
- Argis, a French commune in the Ain department in the Auvergne-Rhône-Alpes region
