= Matei Balș =

Romanian bacteriologist

Matei G. Balș (1905–1989) was a Romanian bacteriologist.

He was born in Bucharest into the boyar Balș family. His paternal grandmother was a sister of Dimitrie A. Sturdza; on his mother's side, Barbu Știrbey was an uncle, and an aunt was married to Ion I. C. Brătianu. His maternal grandfather was Alexandru B. Știrbei, and he was a direct descendant of Constantin Brâncoveanu. He graduated from the medical faculty of the University of Bucharest in 1930. After a bacteriology internship at the Pasteur Institute in Paris, he returned home to collaborate with his uncle Ioan Cantacuzino, who was married to the sister of father. The two worked at the infectious disease hospital in Colentina. In 1942, while Romania was at war with the Soviet Union, he was the director of a hospital on the Eastern Front. After a communist regime was set up in 1947, he was allowed only a very small team of collaborators, and his teaching activity was also affected. Nevertheless, the regime was more tolerant of medical authorities with aristocratic origins than of their counterparts in other fields.

From 1944 to 1952, Balș was instructor, rising to associate professor (1952-1956) and then full professor at what was now the Carol Davila University of Medicine and Pharmacy. Later, he became dean of the Medical-Pharmaceutical Institute and of the specialization faculty for doctors and pharmacists, serving from 1962 to 1972. He established the discipline of clinical bacteriology in Romania, raising the profile of the country's research into infectious pathology. His research extended into virology. He was also prolific as the head of a medical research team and teaching laboratories. He published over 350 scientific papers domestically and 35 abroad. In 1969, he became a titular member of the Academy of Medicine. He also belonged to the Royal Society of Tropical Medicine and Hygiene and the New York Academy of Sciences.

In 1999, Bucharest's infectious disease institute was named after Balș. He and his wife Lucia Cantacuzino had a son and a daughter. His brother Alexandru, an engineer, died at Pitești Prison.

== See more ==
- Bacteriology
