= Dealu Monastery =

Monastery in Dâmbovița County, Romania

- Mănăstirea Dealu
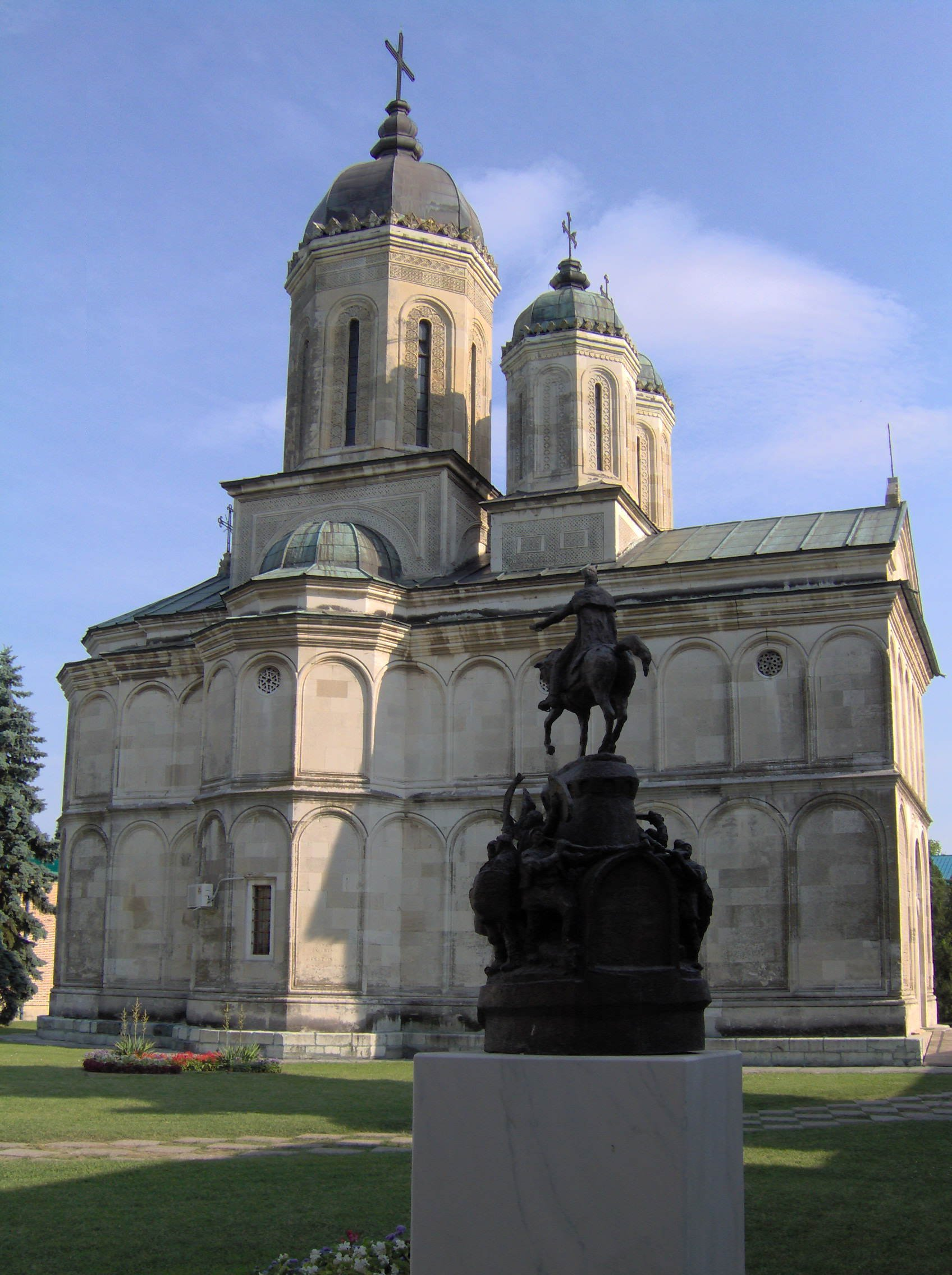
- Church of Dealu Monastery

Religion
- Affiliation: Eastern Orthodox
- Ecclesiastical or organisational status: Nunnery
- Patron: Saint Nicholas
- Year consecrated: 1501
- Status: Active

Location
- Location: Viforâta, Dâmbovița County, Romania
- Interactive map of Dealu Monastery
- Coordinates: 44.958351°N 25.481675°E

Architecture
- Architect: Manolis of Niaesia
- Founder: Radu IV the Great
- Groundbreaking: 26 August 1499
- Materials: Carved stone, brick

Website
- Mănăstirea Dealu

Dealu Monastery is a 15th-century monastery in Dâmbovița County, Romania, located 6 km north of Târgoviște.

The church of the monastery is dedicated to Saint Nicholas.

== Necropolis ==
Dealu Monastery narthex is considered one of the largest funerary spaces in the country, here being buried several voivodes, princes and clergymen. In chronological order, those buried at Dealu Monastery are:

- Vlad II Dracul (cca. 1390–1447), Prince of Wallachia
- Vladislav II (d. 1456), Prince of Wallachia
- Radu IV cel Mare (1467–1508), Prince of Wallachia
- Vlad V cel Tânăr (1488–1512), Prince of Wallachia
- Radu VI Bădica (d. 1524), Prince of Wallachia
- Vlad VII Înecatul (d. 1532), Prince of Wallachia
- Head of Mihai Viteazul (1558–1601), Prince of Wallachia
- Mihail Movilă (d. 1608), Prince of Moldavia
