= Neagoe Basarab =

Romanian saint (c. 1459–1521)

- Voivode of Wallachia
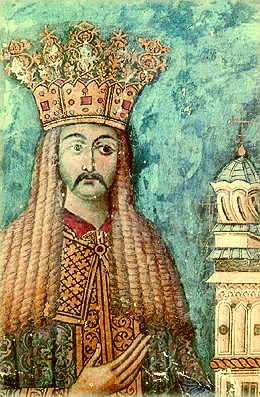

Voivode of Wallachia
- Reign: 23 January 1512 – 15 September 1521
- Predecessor: Vlad cel Tânăr
- Successor: Teodosie of Wallachia
- Born: c. 1459
- Died: 15 September 1521 (aged c. 62)
- Burial: Curtea de Argeș Cathedral
- Spouse: Milica Despina of Serbia
- Issue: Teodosie of Wallachia; Ioan; Petru; Stana of Wallachia; Angelina of Wallachia; Ruxandra of Wallachia
- House: House of Craiovești
- Father: Pârvu Craiovescu or Basarab Țepeluș cel Tânăr
- Mother: Doamna Neaga
- Religion: Eastern Orthodox Church

Saint Neagoe Basarab
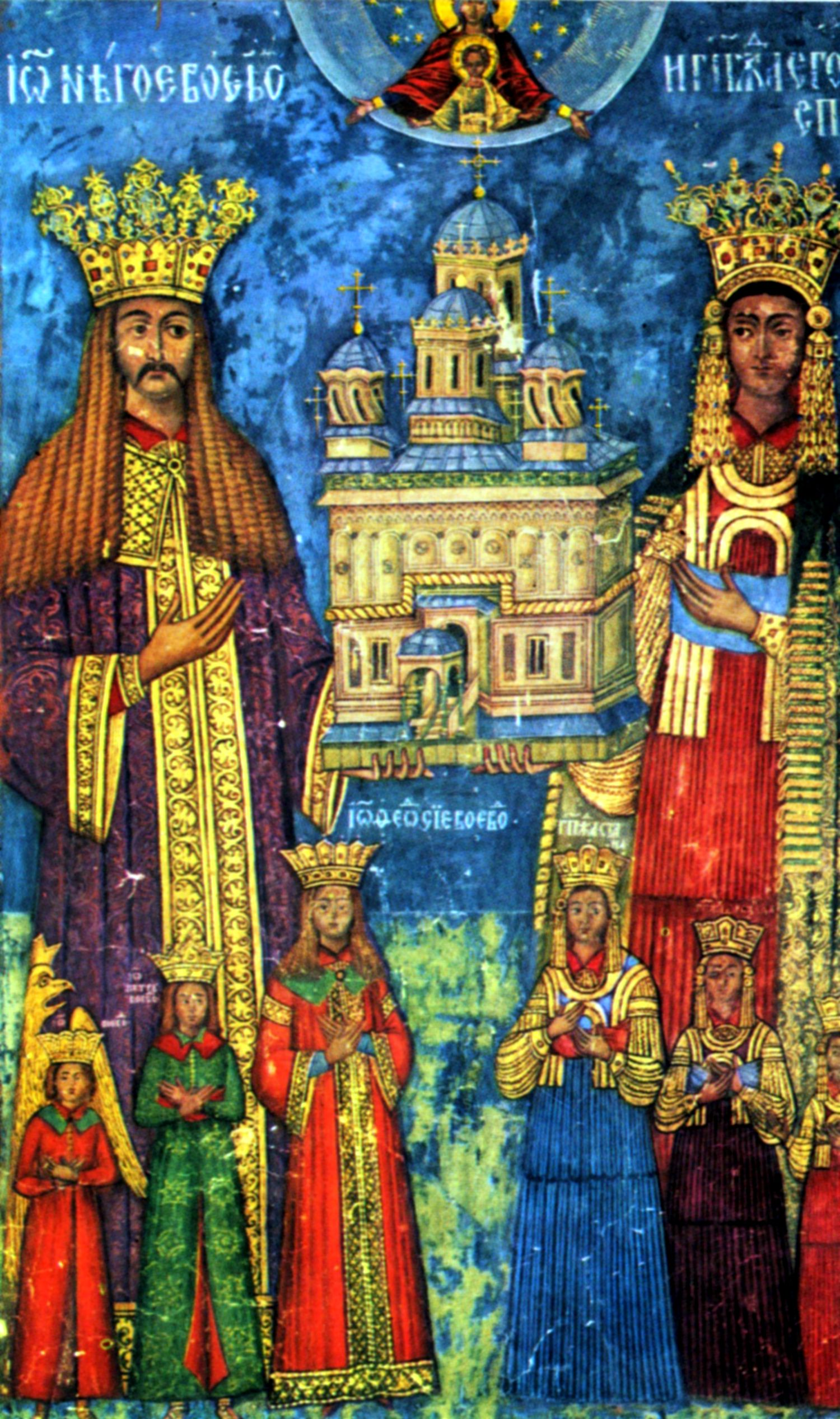
- Neagoe Basarab, Milica Despina and his children pictured on the murals of the Curtea de Argeş Monastery

Voivode of Wallachia
- Venerated in: Eastern Orthodoxy
- Canonized: 8 July 2008, Bucharest by the Holy Synod of the Romanian Orthodox Church
- Major shrine: Cathedral of Curtea de Argeș, Curtea de Argeș, Romania
- Feast: 26 September
- Attributes: Crown; Cross; Sword; Scroll; Hesychast
- Patronage: Romania

Neagoe Basarab (Romanian pronunciation: ['ne̯aɡo.e basaˈrab]; c. 1459 – 15 September 1521) was the Voivode (Prince) of Wallachia between 1512 and 1521. Born into the boyar family of the Craiovești (his reign marks the climax of the family's political influence) as the son of Pârvu Craiovescu or Basarab Țepeluș cel Tânăr, Neagoe Basarab, who replaced Vlad cel Tânăr after the latter rejected Craioveşti tutelage, was noted for his abilities and competence. He is sometimes mentioned as Neagoe Basarab IV, due to other Wallachian rulers by the name Basarab (not Neagoe Basarab) preceding him on the throne, some of them certain members of the House of Basarab and some less so.

He wrote a mirror for princes called The teachings of Neagoe Basarab to his son Theodosie, written in Church Slavonic. It was intended to educate his son on the topics of philosophy, diplomacy, morality and ethics. In 2008, he was posthumously canonised as a Christian saint by the Romanian Orthodox Church. His annual feast day is on 26 September.

== Early life ==
The early life of Neagoe is mostly unknown before his rise to political prominence. His slow rise to power was influenced in large part by the help of his grandfather Neagoe Craiovescu, who pushed from 1508 for his ascendence to the throne. This can be seen in his rising up in political appointments:

- Neagoe acted as "Reckoner" (a kind of secretary) to Patriarch Saint Nephon II during the reign of Radu the Great. Although he served the Patriarch, Nephon is reported to have sought "teaching and soul food" from Neagoe.
- From December 25, 1501 until June 19, 1509 Neagoe acted as a High Seneschal.
- From April 2, 1510 until November 28, 1511 Neagoe acted as High Equerry to the reigning Vlad cel Tânăr.

Mihnea fled Wallachia in 1510 while being pursued by the Craiovescu faction, and Mircea left Wallachia around 26 January 1510, after a battle near Cotmeana with an Ottoman army led by Neagoe Basarab. In November 28, 1511 Neagoe helps capture Mircea and chase him out of the country.

After Pârvu, Bogdan took over the Divan. After November Vlad cel Tânăr and the Craiovești family developed a falling out. The boyars, accustomed to being in the head of the state, were envious of Bogdan's authority. Moreover, Vlad suspected Neagoe of wanting to become the Prince of Wallachia. Vlad summons the Craiovești and makes them swear that Neagoe is not the son of a Lord, threatening to cut off their nose or eyes. As a result, the boyars swear formally, but then deserted Vlad and crossed the Danube to Mehmet. With his help, the Ottoman army and Neagoe started marching to Bucharest. At Văcărești, the battle was lost for Vlad and he was taken prisoner. Neagoe was placed upon the throne using a dubious claim to be the illegitimate Son of Basarab Țepeluș cel Tânăr and his mother Neaga.

== Reign ==
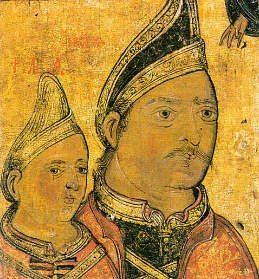
Neagoe Basarab and his son Theodosie (icon from the Dionysiou monastery)

In the 16th century, Wallachia was independent, but was required to pay an exorbitant tribute to the greater force of the Ottoman Empire. Neagoe encouraged the development of crafts and trade, while maintaining a good relation with Wallachia's other powerful neighbour, Hungary.

His diplomacy attempted to establish connections with the Republic of Venice and the Papacy, even offering to mediate the dispute between Eastern Orthodoxy and Roman Catholicism, with the purpose of uniting Christendom against the Ottoman threat.

He adopted the Byzantine tradition of Church patronage, making generous donations to the Orthodox monasteries, not only in Wallachia but throughout the Balkans. During his reign the Curtea de Argeș Monastery was built (in 1517) – legend names Meșterul Manole as the chief craftsman; the account also fuses Neagoe with yet another legendary figure, Prince Radu (who would've caused Manole's death by ordering for the scaffolding to be removed while the builders were on the roof, ensuring that nobody would use Manole's craft, and thus preserving the uniqueness of the structure).

Neagoe ordered the earliest works on the old Metropolitan church in Târgoviște (the city where the edition of the Gospels was published in 1512) and St. Nicholas Church in Șcheii Brașovului.

Neagoe Basarab wrote in Church Slavonic one of the earliest literary works of Wallachia, called "The teachings of Neagoe Basarab to his son Theodosie" (translated in Romanian as Învățăturile lui Neagoe Basarab către fiul său Teodosie), where he touches various subjects such as philosophy, diplomacy, morals and ethics.

After his death, Neagoe was buried at the Curtea de Argeș Cathedral.

== Family ==
He married Milica Despina, daughter of Serbia. Among their children are Teodosie of Wallachia and Ruxandra, wife of Radu of Afumați and Radu Paisie, both princes of Wallachia.

== Canonisation ==
On 8 July 2008, the Holy Synod of the Romanian Orthodox Church officially canonised Neagoe Basarab. His feast day is celebrated every year on 26 September.

== See also ==
- 26th Infantry Battalion "Neagoe Basarab"

== Literature ==
- Grigore, Mihai-D. (2015). Neagoe Basarab - Princeps Christianus: Christianitas-Semantik im Vergleich mit Erasmus, Luther, Machiavelli (1513-1523). Erfurter Studien zur Kulturgeschichte des Orthodoxen Christentums, Volume 10 (in German). Frankfurt: Peter Lang. p. 433. ISBN 9783631665077.

== Notes ==
- "Sfântul Voievod Neagoe Basarab, prinţ al păcii" ("Holy Voivode Neagoe Basarab, Prince of Peace", in Romanian), Alexandru Briciu for Ziarul Lumina newspaper of the Romanian Orthodox Church, Bucharest, 26 September 2009.

Neagoe Basarab House of Craiovești Born: 1462 Died: 1508
Regnal titles
Preceded by Vlad cel Tânăr	Voivode of Wallachia; 1512–1521	Succeeded by Teodosie
