= Bistrița Monastery (Vâlcea) =

Monastery in Vâlcea County, Romania

Coordinates: 45°11′20″N 24°02′24″E

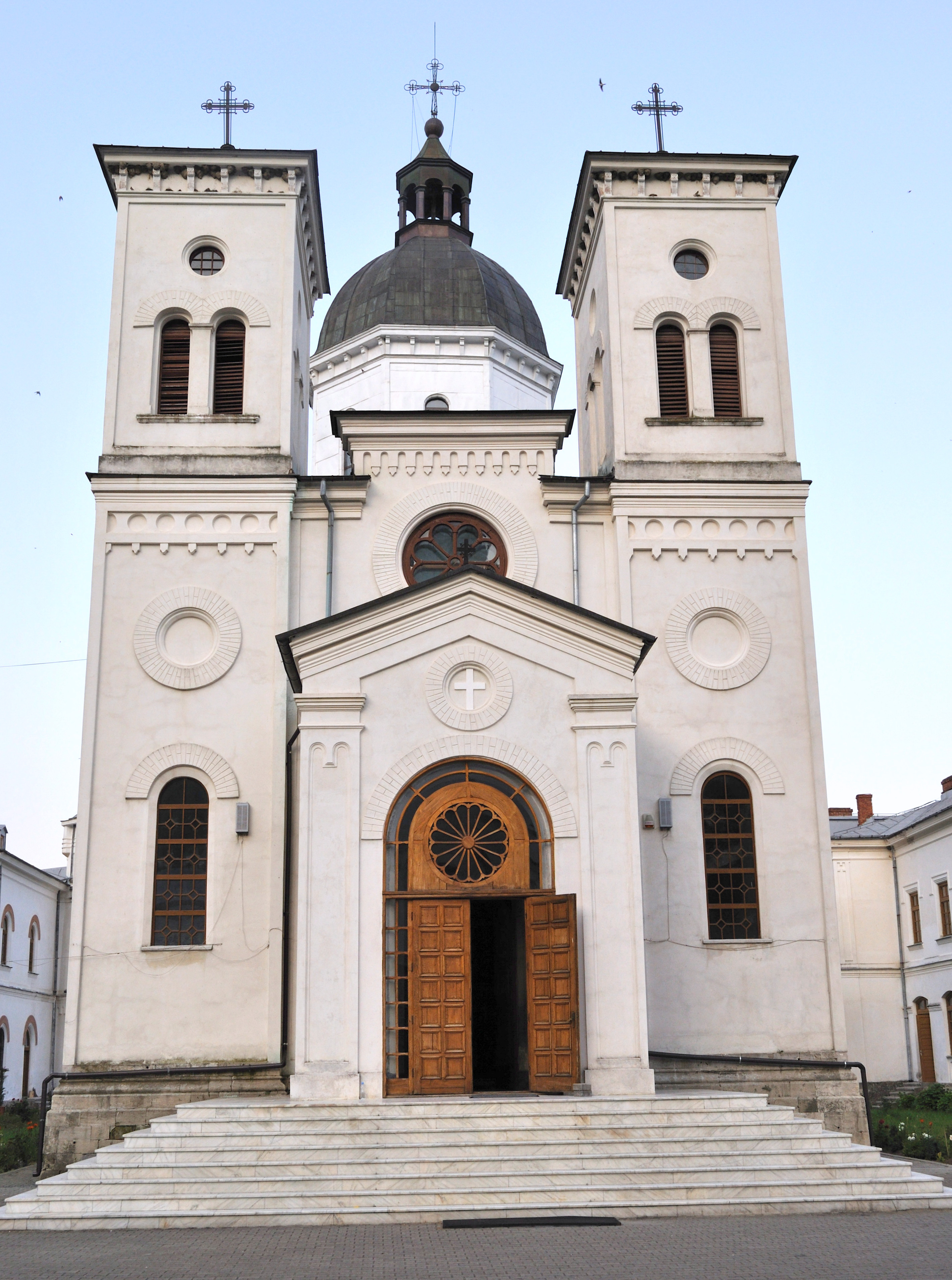
Monastery church

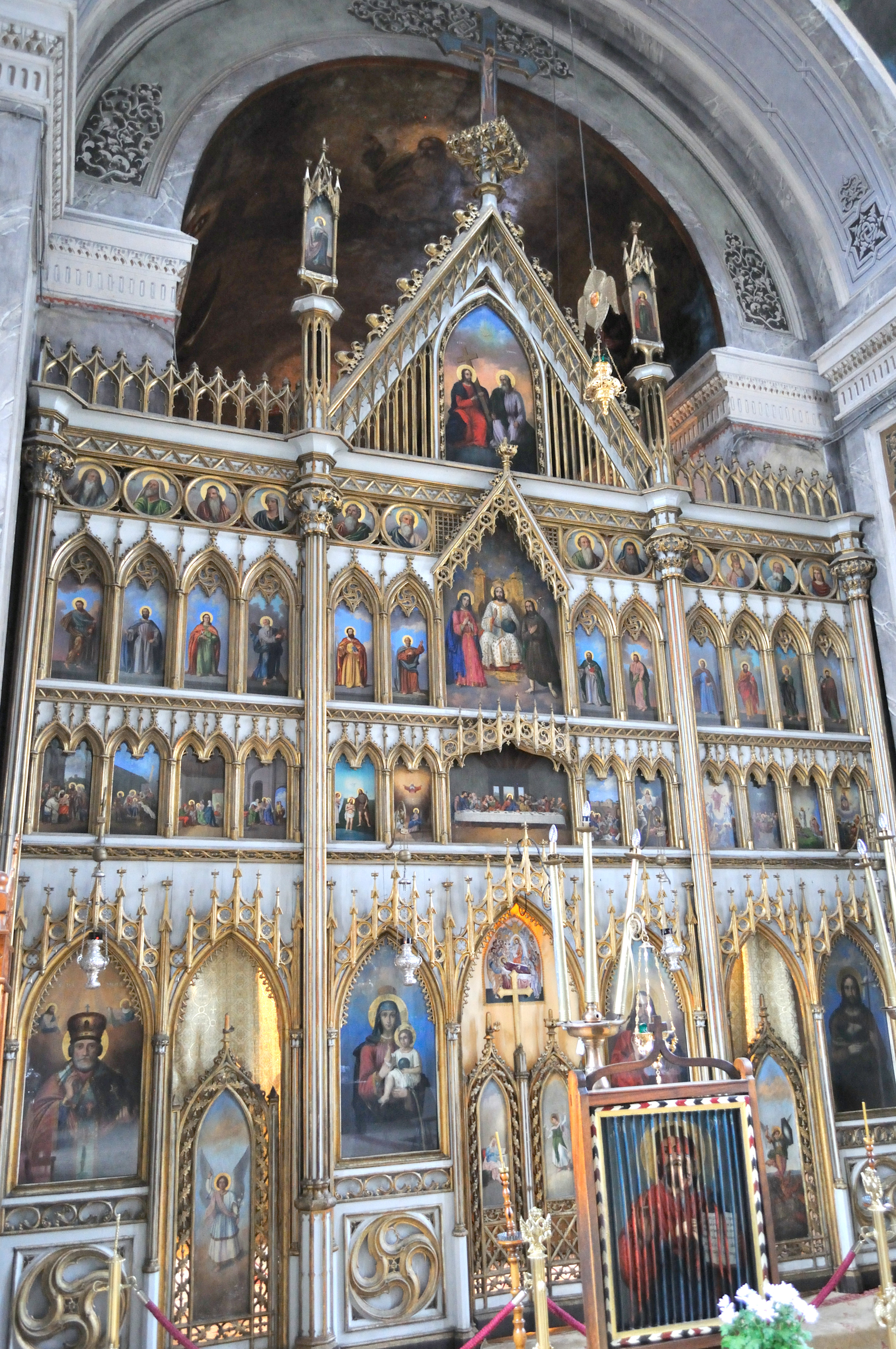
Interior of the church

Bistrița Monastery (Romanian: Mănăstirea Bistrița, pronounced [ˈbistritsa]) is a Romanian Orthodox monastery located in Bistrița village, Costești Commune, Vâlcea County, Romania.

Initially built between 1492 and 1494 by the Craiovești boyars, it was destroyed in 1509 by Mihnea cel Rău and subsequently rebuilt between 1515 and 1519 by the Craiovești. The monastery was rebuilt for a third time between 1846 and 1855, following the damage sustained during the 1838 earthquake. The new church was painted by Gheorghe Tattarescu.
