= Radu Leon =

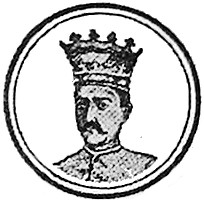
- Portrait of Radu Leon

Prince of Wallachia
- Reign: December 1664 – March 1669
- Predecessor: Grigore I Ghica
- Successor: Antonie Vodă din Popești
- Born: unknown
- Died: 1669
- House: Bogdan-Mușat
- Father: Leon Tomșa
- Religion: Orthodox

Radu Leon (? – 1669) was ruler of Wallachia from 1664 to 1669. He had the byname Radu the Oyster-seller.

== Biography ==
Born into the House of Bogdan-Mușat, he was the son of Wallachian ruler Leon Tomșa, and putative grandson of Ștefan Tomșa, ruler of Moldavia, Radu Leon replaced the deposed Grigore I Ghica in December 1664.

Supposedly barely able to speak Romanian, Radu's authority relied on the support of the Phanariots, and especially the Cantacuzino family. Șerban Cantacuzino, later ruler of Wallachia, served as his chamberlain, and Draghici Cantacuzino commanded Radu's armies.

Anti-Greek protests beginning in December 1668 led to Radu's downfall in March 1669 and replacement by Antonie Vodă din Popești.

Preceded by Grigore I Ghica	Ruler of Wallachia; 1664–1669	Succeeded by Antonie Vodă din Popești
