= Argeș (flamethrower) =

Romanian portable flamethrower

Argeș was a portable Romanian flamethrower designed at the end of the 1930s by the Army's study and experiment laboratory, located in the building of the Obor mask factory. It was adopted by the Romanian Land Forces on June 30, 1943, in order to supplement the Italian Pignone flamethrower of 1937 and the German models of 1935 and 1939. As incendiary mixture, it could use gasoline, petroleum or the special liquid H-E, a compound of gasoline and oil that appeared after the distillation of tar.
