= Balș family =

Moldavian noble family

Coat of arms of the Balș family

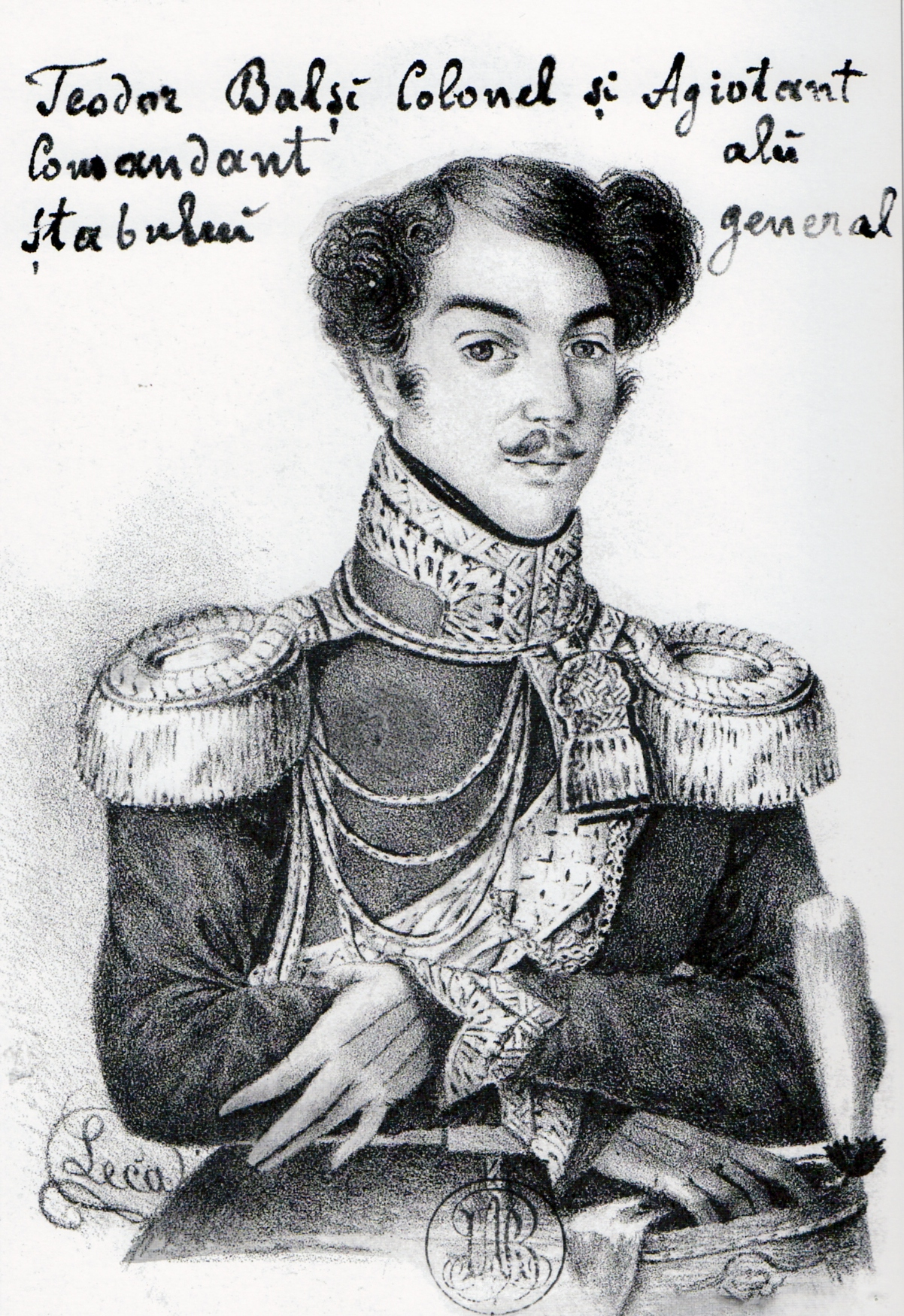
Portrait of colonel Theodor Balș by Constantin Lecca

The Balș family is an old Moldavian noble family, whose origins can be traced back to the 15th century and whose members played important political roles in the history of Moldavia and later Romania, Russia and Austria.

== Origin of the family ==
The family claims descendance from the House of Balšić nobles that ruled over the Principality of Zeta in the 14th and 15th centuries, and through them the House of Baux. This legend is reflected in their heraldry, the family having assumed similar arms. Some historians, such as Alexandru Hâjdeu, have proposed a Slavic or local origin instead, some accepted only the connection to the Rulers of Zeta (Noblemaire, 1913) while others have attempted a full reconstruction of the pedigree up to Leibulf of Provence.

This version of the genealogy, accompanied by the 1813 family tree and armorial, was approved by Moldavian prince Scarlat Callimachi. In Austrian Bukovina it was used by the governor baron Basil von Balsch to solidify his nobility, and in the Russian Empire, Iorgu Balș (a member of the Bessarabian branch of the family) presented it to request baronial status.

Even disregarding its disputed origins, the family stands as one of the longest-documented in the Danubian Principalities, maintaining a continuous presence for centuries.

There is a document from 1487, relating to the founding of the town of Balș, according to which Vlad Călugărul, voivode of Wallachia, allows the knezi Teodor and Ioan Balșu "arriving to our country from beyond the Danube, from the Serbian land" to settle and to establish a town near the Olt river.

The Saint Nicholas church of the Râșca Monastery was built in 1542 by Bishop Macarie using the help of Ioan and Teodor Balș, logothetes of Voivode (Prince) Petru Rareș.

The clear genealogy of the family begins a few decades afterwards with Cârstea or Cristea Balș, overseer of the Royal Court during the reign of Voivode Ieremia Movilă. Most of the members of the family belong to the main branch, originating from Cristea's descendant, Moldavian logothete Lupul Balș (1691–1782). Through the practice of intermarriage, the family has allied itself to powerful families such as the Sturdza, Cantacuzino, Sutzu, Mavrocordatos, and others.

== Arms ==
The standard arms of the Balș family is Gules, a star of seven points or.

The seven-rays variant is consistent with the oldest depictions, and which the Balșes claimed as the arms of the Lords of Baux (from whom they also claimed descent). Other variants have eight or six rays. Some members of the family, such as Moldavian treasurer Alexandru Balș (1801-1864), included elements from the heraldry of allied families in their personal arms. The family arms are also used in the coats of arms of some settlements where they had historical influence, such as Darabani, Albești, Flămânzi in Romania, and Caracui in Moldova.

Coat of arms of the Lords of Baux, representing the Star of Bethlehem. The symbol was owed to the legendary origin of the Baux from the magus Balthazar.

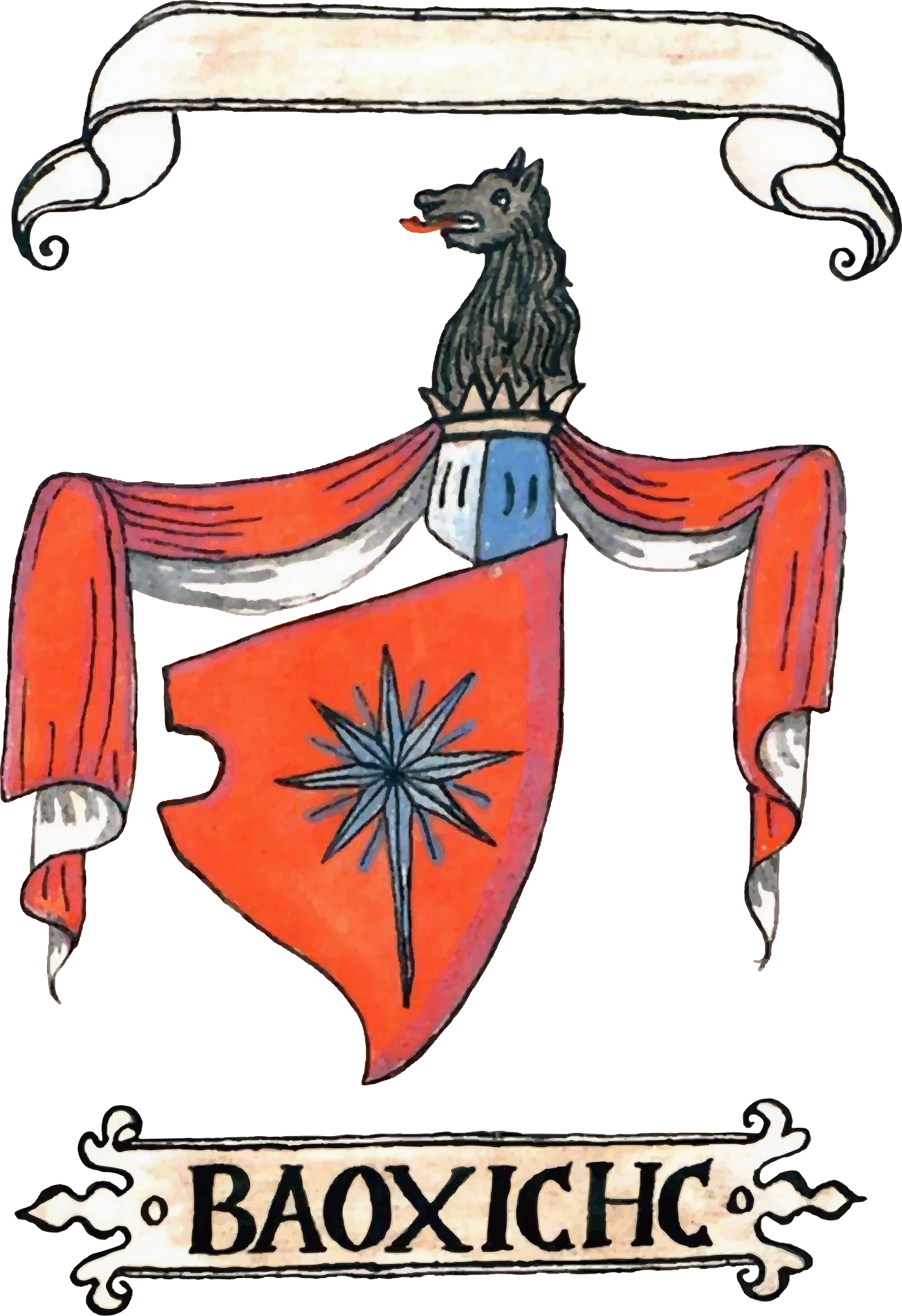
Coat of arms of the Balsha found in the Fojnica Armorial

Coat of arms of Iordache Balș

== Notable members ==
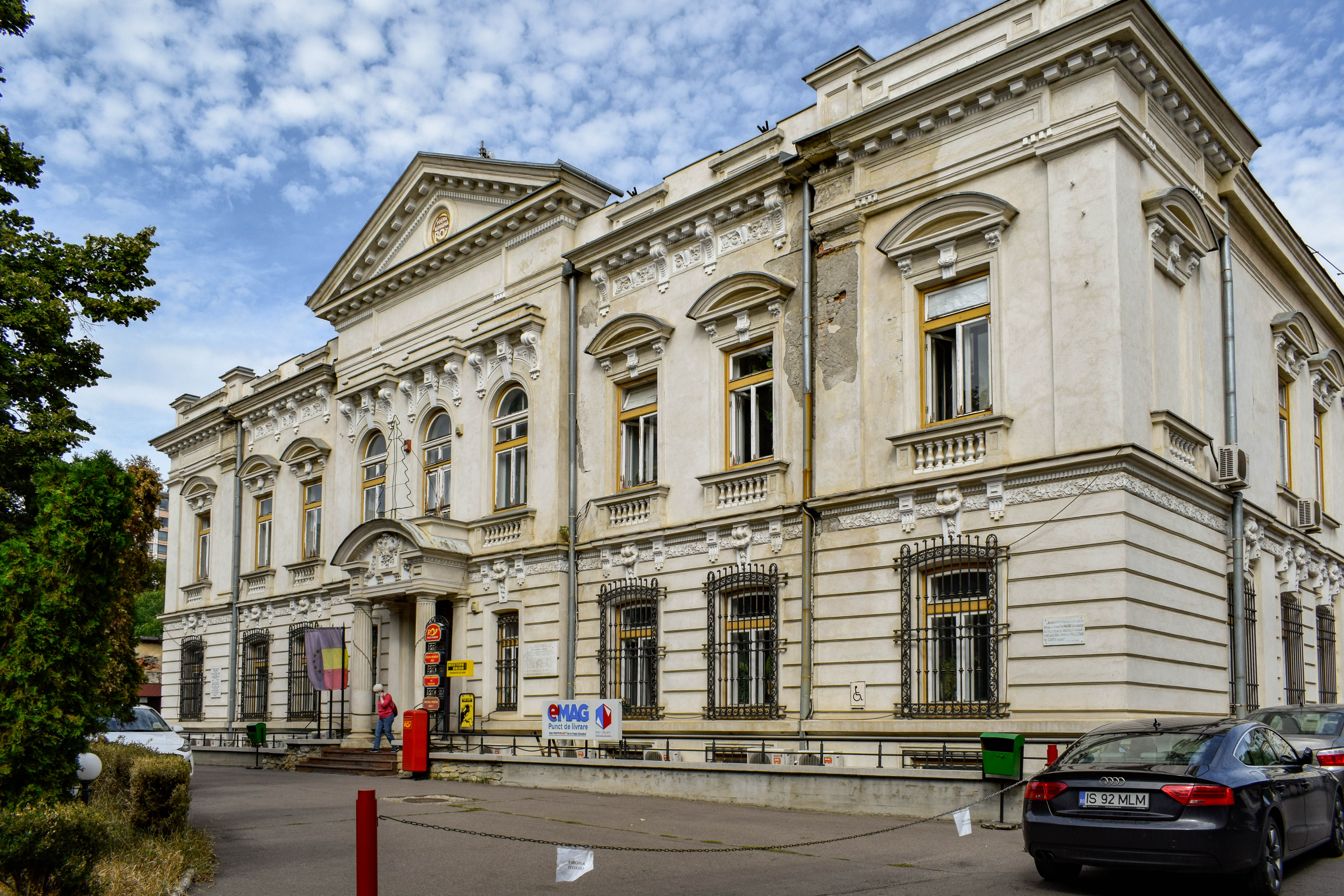
The Balș-Sturdza manor, now the headquarters of Poșta Română in Iași

Throughout its history, the Moldavian family has been firmly associated with the government, with many of its members holding important political and administrative positions in the region.

Among the most important:

- Vasile Balș, also known as Basil Freiherr von Balsch, governor of Bukovina within the Austrian Empire (1792–1803).
- Iorgu Balș (1805–1857), Russian diplomat, founder of the Balș Orphanage in Chișinău, and greatest land-owner in the Bessarabia Governorate.
- Teodor Balș, caimacam (ruler) of Moldavia between 1856 and 1857.
- Grigore Balș, Finance Minister of the first Romanian government.
- Gheorghe Balș (1868–1934), Romanian engineer, architect and art historian.
- Matei G. Balș (1905–1989), Romanian bacteriologist.
