= Glavacioc Monastery =

Monastery in Romania

Coordinates: 44°28′16″N 25°15′27″E

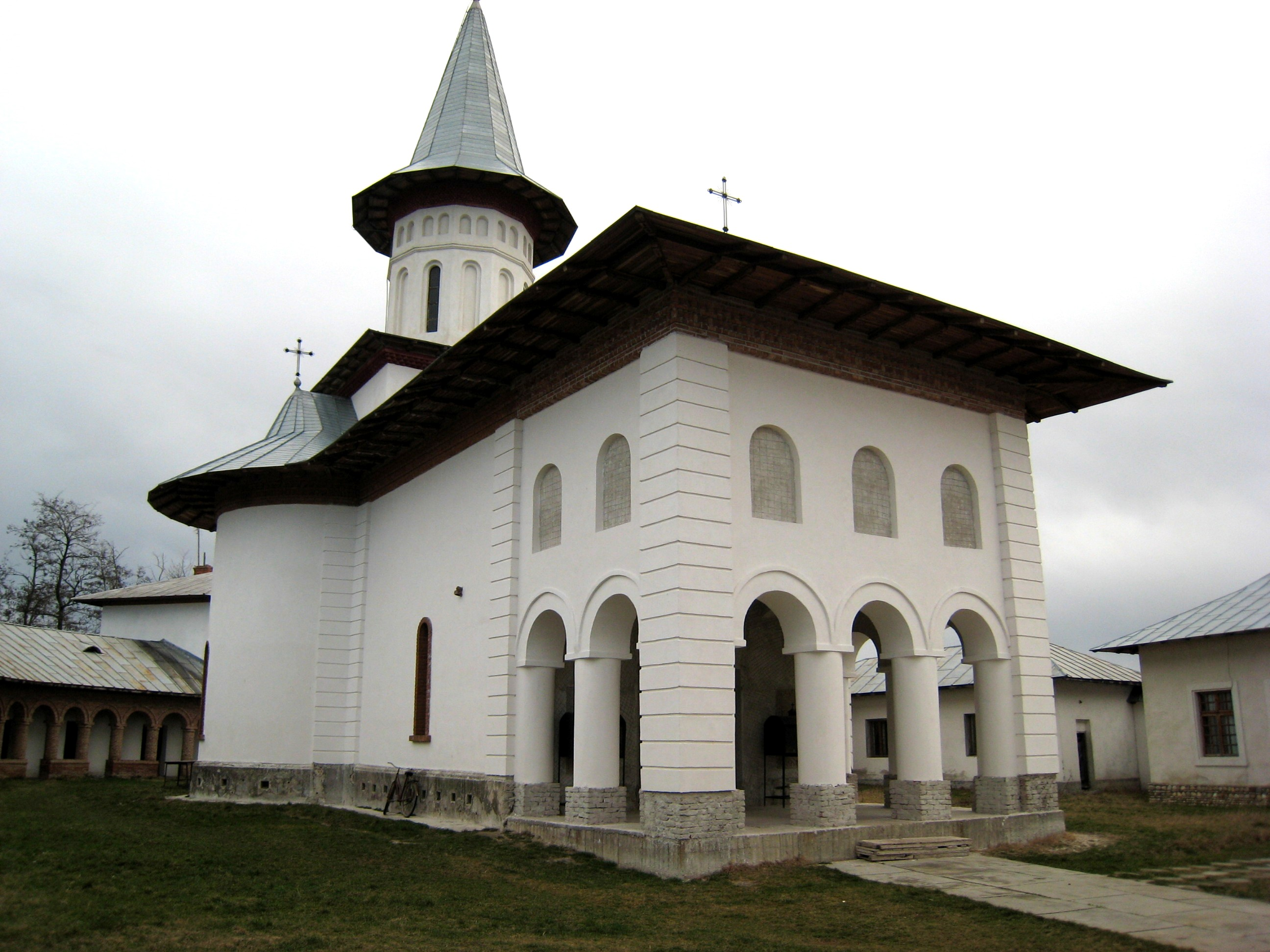
Glavacioc Monastery church

The Glavacioc Monastery (Romanian: Mănăstirea Glavacioc) is a Romanian Orthodox monastery situated in Argeș County, Romania.

== History ==
It is generally considered it was built during the reign of Mircea I of Wallachia, who donated the village of Călugăreni, Giurgiu, to the monastery. The wooden church was replaced with a stone church by Vlad Călugărul in 1495. It was repaired by Mihnea Turcitul, Constantin Brancoveanu and the boyar Costache Faca. The monastery was closed down during the communist rule and reopened in 1991. The starets of the monastery is the hieromonk Casian Creţu.
