= Aninoasa, Dâmbovița =

Aninoasa
- Commune
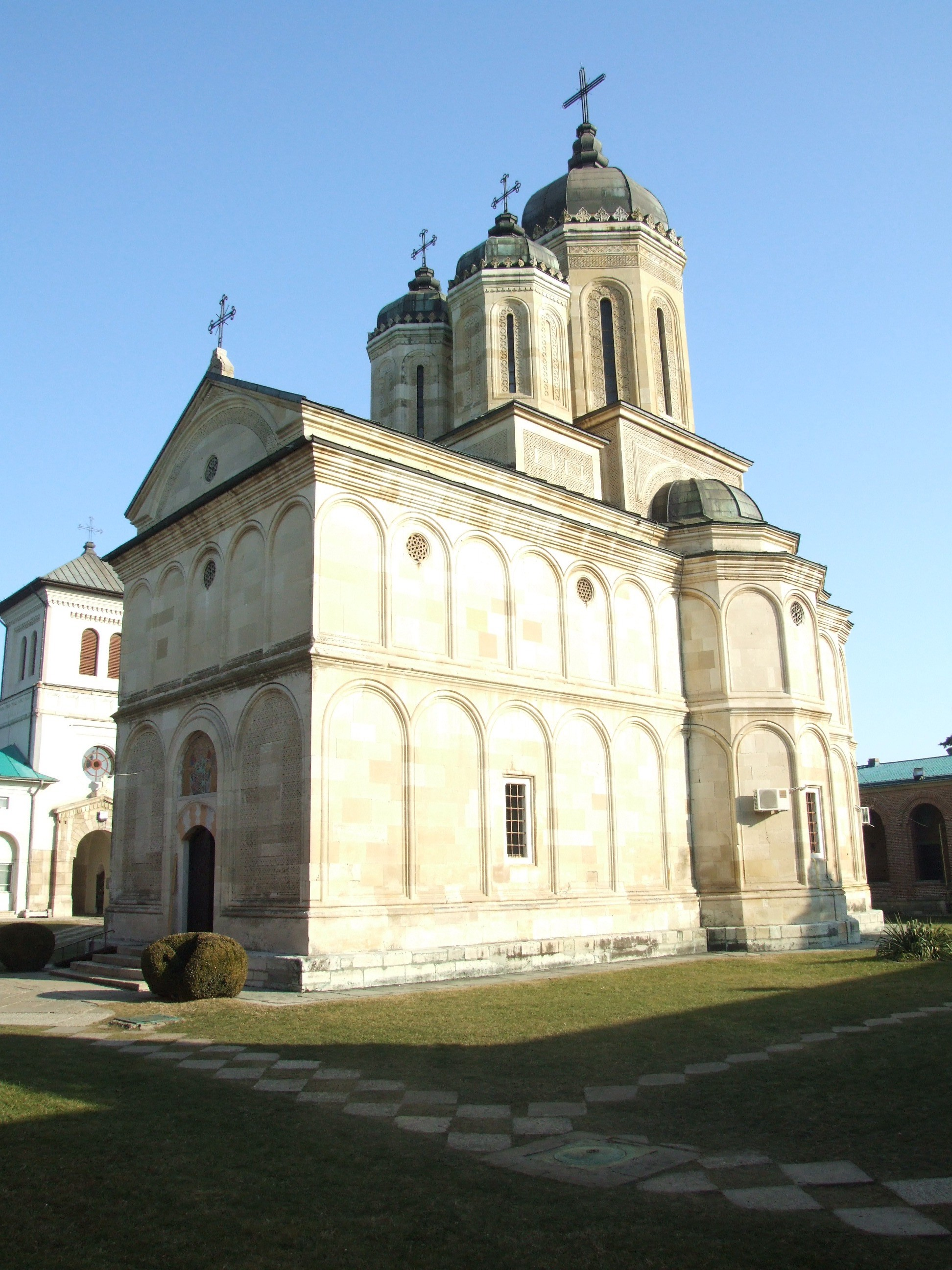
- Saint Nicholas' church of Dealu Monastery

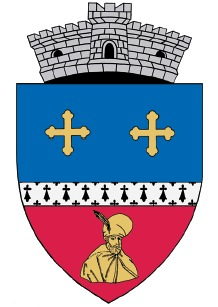
- Coat of arms

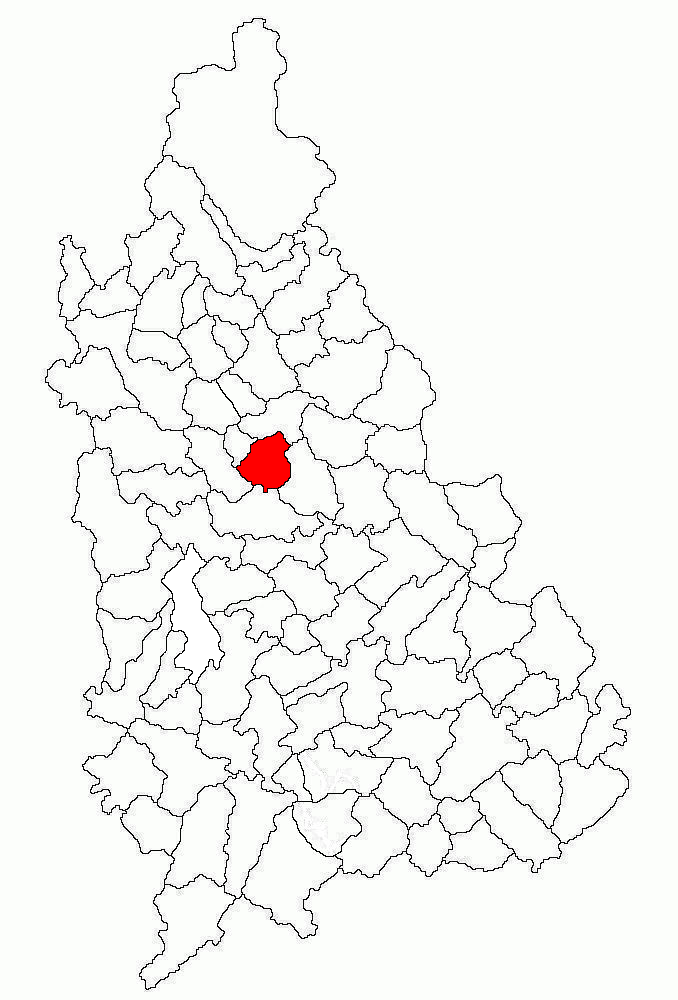
- Location in Dâmbovița County

- Location in Romania
- Coordinates: 45°4′N 25°26′E
- Country: Romania
- County: Dâmbovița

Government
  - Mayor (2024–2028): Vlăduț Niculae (PSD)
- Area: 27.66 km^{2} (10.68 sq mi)
- Elevation: 317 m (1,040 ft)
- Population (2021-12-01): 6,665
  - Density: 241.0/km^{2} (624.1/sq mi)
- Time zone: UTC+02:00 (EET)
  - Summer (DST): UTC+03:00 (EEST)
- Postal code: 137005
- Area code: +(40) 245
- Vehicle reg.: DB
- Website: aninoasa.com

Aninoasa is a commune in Dâmbovița County, Romania. It is composed of three villages: Aninoasa, Săteni, and Viforâta. It is situated in the historical region of Muntenia.

The commune has two monasteries, Dealu Monastery and Viforâta Monastery. Its name is derived from "Anin", a Romanian word for the Alder tree.

Historical population
Year	Pop.	±%
1925	3,537	—
2002	5,982	+69.1%
2011	6,344	+6.1%
2021	6,665	+5.1%
Source: Census data
