= Viișoara, Teleorman =

Viișoara
- Commune
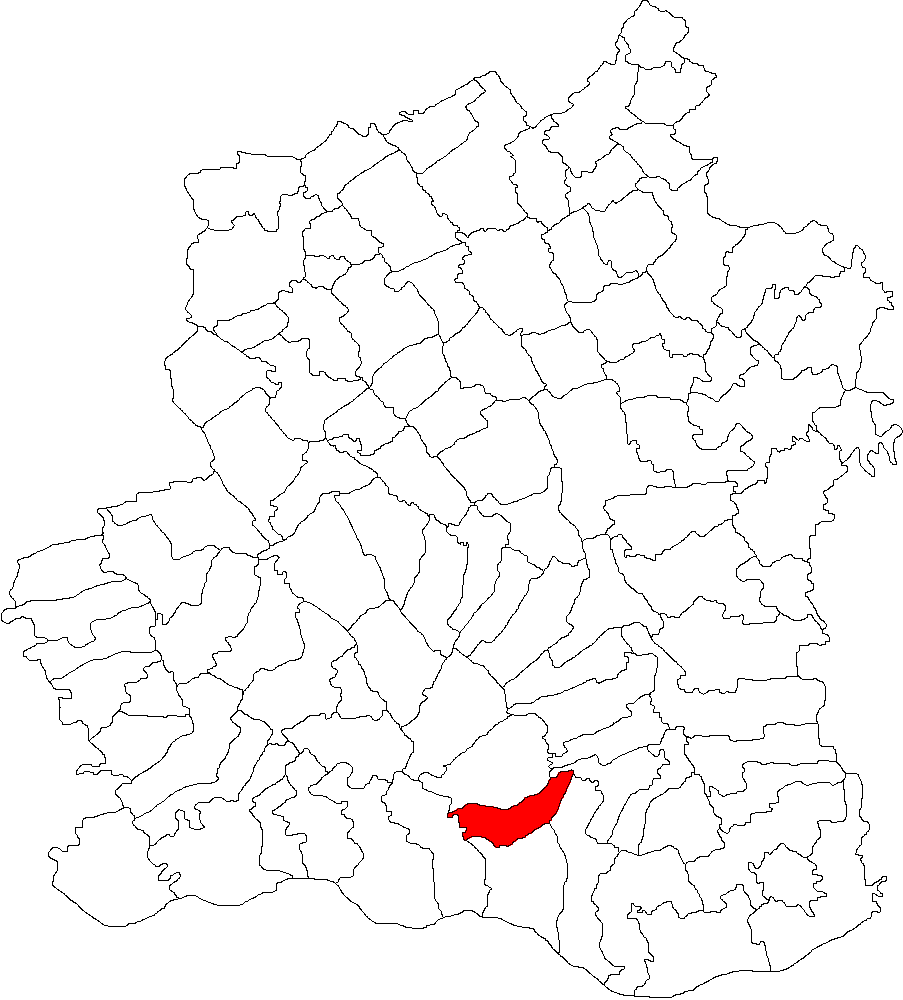
- Location in Teleorman County

- Location in Romania
- Coordinates: 43°47′N 25°10′E
- Country: Romania
- County: Teleorman

Government
  - Mayor (2020–2024): Tiberiu Dan Neamu (PNL)
- Area: 46.15 km^{2} (17.82 sq mi)
- Elevation: 62 m (203 ft)
- Population (2021-12-01): 1,438
  - Density: 31/km^{2} (81/sq mi)
- Time zone: EET/EEST (UTC+2/+3)
- Postal code: 147435
- Area code: +(40) 247
- Vehicle reg.: TR
- Website: www.primaria-viisoara.ro

Viișoara is a commune in Teleorman County, Muntenia, Romania. It is composed of a single village, Viișoara.
