= Craiovești =

Boyar family in Wallachia

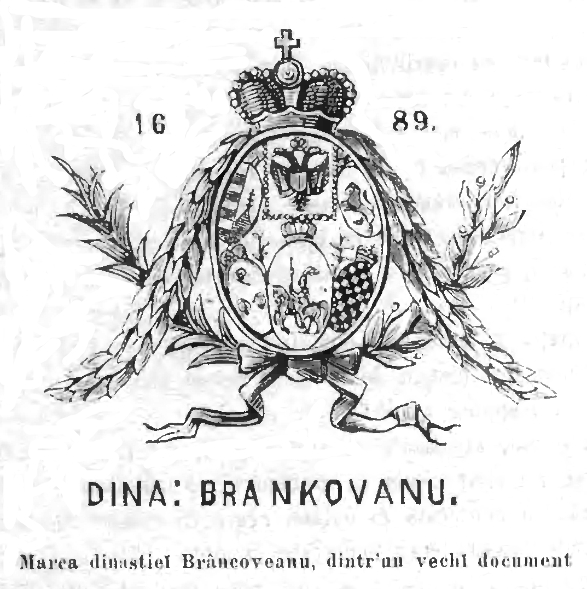
Coat of arms of Brâncoveanu family

The House of Craiovești (Romanian pronunciation: [krajoˈveʃtʲ]), later House of Brâncovenești ([brɨŋkoveˈneʃtʲ]), was a boyar family in Wallachia who gave the country several of its Princes and held the title of Ban of Oltenia (whether of Strehaia or Craiova) for ca. 60 years.

== History ==
The first member to rise to prominence was a certain Neagoe, a member of the Sfat who became Ban of Strehaia under Basarab Țepeluș cel Tânăr (sometime after 1477). His son Pârvu Craiovescu (d. 1512), a Great Vornic, was the father of Neagoe Basarab – who became Prince of Wallachia in 1512 after replacing Vlad cel Tânăr (who had begun opposing the family's political influence); in the late 15th century, the Craiovești had been a leading and extremely rich dynasty, virtually independent rulers of Oltenia, regional allies of the Ottoman Empire in front of princely authority, builders of churches on Mount Athos, and administrators of the Ottoman customs in Vidin (present-day Bulgaria). After an Ottoman occupation in the early 1520s convinced the Craiovești to rally behind their Prince Radu de la Afumați, their agreement with Sultan Süleyman the Magnificent brought about Radu's defeat and submission.

The Oltenian line of succession of the Craiovești was ended by Vlad Înecatul, who used this as a means to quell boyar rebellions.

Through the closely related Brâncovenești, the family once again rose to the throne: first with Matei Basarab (ruled 1632–1654), and a second time with Constantin Brâncoveanu (ruled 1688–1714). Although also related to the Cantacuzino family, the Brâncovenești entered a bloody feud with the latter, centered on mutual denunciations for treason to the Ottoman overlord – in reality, Prince Constantin Brâncoveanu's secret negotiations with the Habsburg monarchy and Peter the Great's Imperial Russia were continued (after his execution in Constantinople) by his rival and successor Ștefan Cantacuzino.

The latter's downfall brought the establishment of Phanariote rules, enforced as a measure of security by Sultan Ahmed III. The Brâncovenești-Cantacuzino conflict is mirrored in Dimitrie Cantemir's Historia Hieroglyphica (a work which takes the Cantacuzinos' side).

Members of the family remained present in the political life of Wallachia throughout the 18th and early 19th centuries, and were seated in the Divan among the few pro-Russian boyar families. Ban Grigore Brâncoveanu was the leader of the regency council after the death of Prince Alexander Soutzos (in 1821) – he approached the nationalist leader of Oltenian pandurs, Tudor Vladimirescu, in an attempt to block Scarlat Callimachi's ascension to the throne, thus providing the context for the anti-Phanariote uprising of that year (he also welcomed Russian occupation during the War of 1828–1829).

Its last representative, Zoe Brâncoveanu, born Mavrocordato and adopted by Ban Grigore in 1820, married Prince Gheorghe Bibescu – despite their divorce, the patrimony (of Basarab-Brâncoveanu) was passed on to the Bibescu family through the son of Gheorghe and Zoe, Prince Grégoire Bibesco-Bassaraba (the father of Anna de Noailles).
