= Banul Mărăcine =

Banul Mărăcine (Barbu III Craiovescu)
- Wallachian bird with Craiovești arms in escutcheon, as used by Matei Basarab

Ban of Oltenia
- In office March 17, 1534 – August 1535

De facto Prince of Wallachia
- In office February – April 1536?

Personal details
- Died: August 1?, 1565 Istanbul, Ottoman Empire
- Resting place: Sea of Marmara
- Relations: Preda Craiovescu (father); Neagoe Basarab (uncle?); Teodosie of Wallachia (cousin); Drăghici Gogoașă (uncle); Hamza of Obislav (nephew)
- Children: Nicolaus Bassaraba? one or several daughters?

Banul Mărăcine or Mărăcină (Romanian for "The Ban Bramble"), common rendition of Barbu III Craiovescu, Barbu Mărăcine or Barbu Basarab (Latin: Barbulus Bassaraba, Turkish: Koca Barbul Ban; died August 1?, 1565), was a historical figure in Wallachia, who claimed the title of Prince. He was one of several Craiovești pretenders to the throne, a category which also included his father, Preda Craiovescu. Mărăcine himself entered historical record in 1532, when, as an opponent of Prince Vlad VI, he had his estate confiscated. He returned to favor later that year, with the crowning of Vlad Vintilă de la Slatina. Like Preda before him, Mărăcine served as Ban of Oltenia, becoming the last of his family to hold that title. According to various accounts, he turned against his new lord, from organizing armed resistance in Oltenia to involving himself in Vlad Vintilă's assassination. He was able to maintain his position following the crowning of Radu Paisie, but was eventually toppled by the latter in mid-1535.

Mărăcine's own bid for the throne was embraced by some factions of the local boyardom, who took up arms against Paisie in 1536. Since the Craiovești claim contradicted the standards of Wallachian customary law, Mărăcine depicted himself as a son of Neagoe Basarab; he was perhaps Neagoe's nephew. The resulting civil war allegedly involved a hand-to-hand duel between the two rivals, and also saw Paisie's mutilation by the rebels. Barbu probably seized the Wallachian throne with Ottoman acquiescence, before being driven out by the returning Paisie later in 1536. Various records suggest that he lived in exile with his son Nicolaus Bassaraba, and that both of them continued to claim the throne. Barbu was ultimately killed in Istanbul, having encountered the wrath of Suleiman the Magnificent; Nicolaus escaped punishment and fled to the Spanish Empire, but still styled himself a Prince. His male descendants continued to be involved in intrigues in both Wallachia and Moldavia, down to the 1650s.

Mărăcine's memory survived in Romanian folklore, which identifies him as the patron of various places around Dolj County. A modern legend also claimed him, anachronistically, as the ancestor of French Renaissance poet Pierre de Ronsard. This invented tradition probably found its first complete form in an eponymous ballad by Vasile Alecsandri, published in the 1850s. It later also inspired prose by, among others, Grigore H. Grandea and N. D. Popescu-Popnedea, and verse drama by V. A. Urechia. Mărăcine's name and his legendary career remain associated with a dance routine and a variety of Romanian wine.

== Biography ==
=== Origins and early causes ===
A tributary of the Ottoman Empire from 1417, Wallachia was frequently troubled by civil wars, with various branches of the House of Basarab fighting each other for the throne. Mărăcine's birth coincided with the political advent of his family, the Craiovești, which claimed descent from the Drăculești Basarabs, through Prince Neagoe Basarab. The latter's own dynastic claim was doubtful, and, as various historians note, relied on him being recognized as the natural son of Basarab IV Țepeluș. A competing hypothesis is that Neagoe's mother and Țepeluș's wife, Negea, was in fact a Craiovești by birth. Historian Ion Donat also notes that the Craiovești and Brâncoveni were related to the Basarabs not only through Neagoe, but also through a 1450s Prince, Vladislav II.

Beyond this dispute, it is likely that Neagoe and all other Craiovești descended from one Vlacsan Florev, which made them relatives of three other kingmaking boyar families: the Florescus, the Buzești, and the Drăgoești. According to standard interpretations, Neagoe's official father was the Vornic Pârvu Craiovescu; Pârvu's daughter (and Mărăcine's presumed aunt) Marga was the matriarch of another Craiovești branch, centered on the estate of Brâncoveni. Mărăcine's father, the Ban Preda Craiovescu, was very likely Pârvu's son: historian N. Stoicescu provides sources that describe Preda as either Neagoe's cousin or brother. Another scholar, Radu Oprea, argues that the Prince and Ban were indisputably brothers.

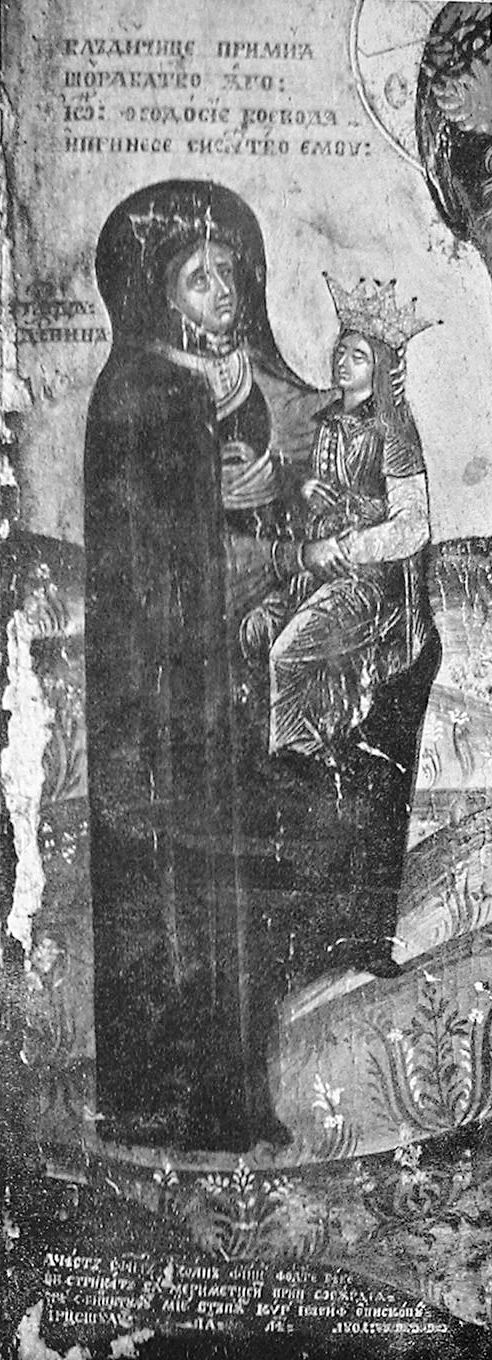
Teodosie's body being held up by his mother, Princess Milica, in a contemporary votive icon. The Prince's death transferred his claim to collateral Craiovești, including Mărăcine

Neagoe was succeeded in 1521 by his son Teodosie. Preda Craiovescu, who fashioned himself a regent, died the same year, in battle against Teodosie's enemy, Vlad Dragomir Călugărul. All the main Drăculești lines were probably extinguished with the deaths of Princes Teodosie and Moise; the Craiovești took over their claim, even though this broke the laws of succession: their only probable link to the Drăculești was maternal. Between 1530 and 1532, the family split into rival camps, with some supporting Vlad VI and others conspiring to have him removed. In late 1530, another member of the family, Drăghici Gogoașă, passed himself off as Neagoe's son, rather than his cousin, in an effort to usurp Vlad VI. His forgery sparked the wrath of Sultan Suleiman the Magnificent, who oversaw his hanging at Istanbul.

As noted by scholar Constantin Rezachevici, historians were prone to identify Drăghici and Mărăcine as one and the same person, until documents discovered in 1976 proved them wrong. The actual Mărăcine, or Barbu III Craiovescu, also appears to have been entangled in the conspiracy to topple Vlad VI, but, according to Oprea, only from March 1532. A writ of the period notes that the estates of "Jupan Barbul and Preda the Ban" were confiscated by the Prince, then assigned to Mărăcine's loyalist nephew, Hamza of Obislav. Mărăcine reached prominence following Vlad VI's accidental drowning, when Vlad Vintilă de la Slatina took over as Prince. The new monarch confirmed him as Ban of Oltenia on March 17, 1534, some three months after Hamza had been removed from that position. Like his father, Mărăcine probably established his regional court southwest of Craiova, in his family's fortified church, and built primitive defenses along the Jiu River.

By then, the political landscape of Wallachia had been complicated further, with Vlad Vintilă and some of the boyars remaining loyal to the Ottomans, while others began hatching plots to align the country with the Habsburg Kingdom of Hungary, which was fighting the Little War. A contemporary report by Alvise Gritti alleges that Barbu, on surface a pro-Ottoman, also sided with the Hungarians. This text suggests that "Barbul Ban" was removed from office, but still withdrew to Craiova; in retaliation, Oltenia was invaded by loyalists from Buzău County. These were supposed to exercise terror in Vlad Vintilă's name, but also to help the Prince in preparing his own anti-Ottoman uprising.

According to medievalist Irina F. Cîrstina, Gritti's account should be disregarded as entirely spurious. Nevertheless, other scholars also highlight the mounting conflict between the Prince and the Ban. Valentin Gheonea attributes Vlad Vintilă's assassination in June 1535 specifically to the Craiovești boyars. "The most powerful group at the time", they became "annoyed by the prince's exceedingly authoritarian manner". This is also proposed by Claudiu Neagoe. Unlike Gritti, he describes Mărăcine and the Craiovești as Ottoman loyalists who resented Vlad Vintilă's push for emancipation. He also notes that Barbu organized the hunting trip which created an opportunity for assassination. This account originates with Macarious Zaim, who claims that the boyars killed the Prince before he could kill them, and locates these events in Craiova.

=== 1536 uprising and exile ===
The new ruler was a former monk, Radu Paisie, alleged son of Radu the Great. Though appointed by a boyar consensus, he soon had conflicts with the more prominent families. Barbu III was last mentioned as Ban on July 30, 1535, stripped of his office by August, and ultimately replaced with Șerban of Izvorani. According to Oprea, the demotion "probably occurred after August 9". Now established as a dissenter, Mărăcine also stated a claim to the throne, taking up the family tradition. This also implied falsifying his lineage and describing himself as Neagoe's son, rather than nephew.

Paisie was subsequently faced with a boyar rebellion, which may have ended with his dethronement. As noted by Gheonea, Paisie's ouster may be verified by the absence of writs issued in his name at any point between August and December 1536, and again between August and October 1537. This is corroborated by the writings of Nicolaus Olahus. Olahus claims that Paisie and the rebel leader, who may have been Barbu III, fought a duel in front of their boyar armies; the latter was defeated and captured, but his partisans freed him from prison, then assailed Paisie, mutilated him, and sent him into exile. Rezachevici and other historians believe that the episode was a Craiovești ascendancy, and that Mărăcine was the actual Prince of Wallachia between February and April 1536.

As Rezachevici notes (based on the account in Olahus), Mărăcine was, at least in the beginning, supported by Sultan Suleiman and the Ottoman Army. Though they do not record the name of Paisie's usurper, scholars Cristina Feneșan and Jean-Louis Bacqué-Grammont discuss him as involved in Ottoman in-fighting: the anonymous boyar favorite was also backed by Pargalı Ibrahim Pasha, the Ottoman Grand Vizier; the latter lost his position and his life in early 1563, being replaced by Ayas Mehmed Pasha, who probably supported Paisie. Also backing Mărăcine were Tudor of Drăgoești, the country's Logothete, and Ban Toma of Pietroșani. Both were swiftly executed by Paisie, who retook his crown with assistance from the Eastern Hungarian Kingdom.

Traditional historiography held that Barbu died childless, and was therefore the last notable member of his family. Rezachevici argues against this interpretation, noting that it is only true in the sense that no other Craiovești served as Bans. Rezachevici proposes that Mărăcine may have traveled through Europe before moving to Istanbul with his wife, his unnamed daughter, and a son, Nicolaus Bassaraba. The latter was also identified as Mărăcine's son by genealogist G. D. Florescu. Other records may suggest that Mărăcine also continued to involve himself in intrigues, both in Wallachia and, with time, in neighboring Moldavia. In July 1536, Božidar Vuković "della Vecchia", who spied on behalf of the Holy Roman Empire, noted that an unnamed "king of Wallachia", present in Istanbul, had signed up to the project of anti-Ottoman rebellion. Rezachevici believes that this was "very probably Barbu himself", while Gheonea reads it as a reference to Paisie and his secretive anti-Ottoman agenda.

Several historians believe that, in 1563, Nicolaus conspired with Moldavia's Prince, Iacob Heraclid, to take over as a Wallachian vassal. The primary source which provides evidence for this refers to Heraclid's associate as the "son of Basarab". According to Claudiu Neagoe, "Nicolae Basarab, son of Barbu Craiovescu" was to be installed as puppet ruler following Hercalid's defeat of Peter the Younger. This plan was vetoed by Suleiman, and abandoned as Heraclid withdrew to Moldavia. Rezachevici also argues that Nicolaus Bassaraba remains the relevant source for Mărăcine's later life and death. Nicolaus claimed that "my father Barbulus Bassaraba" was strangled in 1565, on the orders of Sultan Suleiman, after engaging in a conspiracy. He himself escaped a similar fate by fleeing to Hospitaller Malta, and then fought for the Spanish Empire as a mercenary. A German diplomatic letter of August 15, 1565 seemingly backs this account, noting that on August 1 a "former despot of Wallachia" had been decapitated, then thrown into the Sea of Marmara. As noted by Rezachevici, the source "could only refer to Barbu III Craiovescu".

== Legacy ==
=== Early posterity ===
Latin signature of Nicolaus Bassaraba, referring to himself as heir to "Transalpine Wallachia"

Although much of the family was expunged from Wallachia, its matrilineal descendants continued to claim and hold high offices at the court of successive Princes. Still living in Wallachia, Mărăcine's aunt Marga was the mother of two sons, Vâlsan and Matei. She sold her estate Bistreț to Paisie, as a means to free both brothers from Ottoman slavery. Armaș Detco of Brâncoveni, who was Marga's in-law and possibly also more directly related to the clan, remained loyal to Paisie and received many of the old Craiovești estates. Despite their conflict with Paisie, both Vâlsan and Matei were forced into exile by his rival and successor, Mircea Ciobanul.

From his own exile, Nicolaus Bassaraba pleaded with the crowned heads of Western Europe to help him obtain the Wallachian crown, and also canvassed financial support. Though he never occupied the throne, in 1569, at Segovia, he created his sponsor, Hans Heher, a "Marquess of Ialomița". He disappeared from records in 1574. One hypothesis in the community of historians argues that Nicolaus was the father of Cremonese Basarab, who in November 1599 tried to replace Nicolae Pătrașcu as Wallachian Prince, with Ottoman backing. Another theory, advanced by historian Cristian Luca, identifies Cremonese as the natural father of a daughter, born before 1574, and the adoptive father of two other girls, whose real father was the Veneto-Cypriote Carlo Cornelio Zamberlan. According to this reading, Cremonese married Zamberlan's widow, Franceschina Ghisi. Based on this identification, Mărăcine's grandson converted to Catholicism in the 1580s, but was rebuked by Pope Sixtus V for keeping "four wives".

Cremonese's only son was probably born to Franceschina, and styled himself Neagu vodă Basarab; he may have been Barbu III's last direct descendant. Unlike his ancestors, Neagu set his sights on obtaining the throne of Moldavia. The other surviving Craiovești line briefly took the Wallachian throne in 1603, with Radu Șerban, widely seen as the second reigning member of the house, after Neagoe. In the 1630s, another collateral line of the Craiovești, claiming descent from Marga and Detco, took over with Matei Basarab seizing the throne. In the years after his coronation, and leading up to the battle of Finta, Matei backed Neagu's Moldavian project. According to Luca, Neagu never got to see either Wallachia or Moldavia, instead spending his entire life in Istanbul.

With time, Banul Mărăcine became a character in Romanian folklore, the hero of several Oltenian legends. The first one of these, preserved by the peasants of Dolj County, was written down in 1830. These stories establish strong links between Mărăcine, described as Prince of Wallachia, and various landmarks in and around Coșoveni, and along Bănesele River; some also describe his burial site as Sadova Monastery, which may be the result of confusion between various Craiovești. Other oral traditions refer to his paramour, a boyaress from Ghindeni, and claim that Mărăcine had fathered several daughters. A folk song, known as Vlad Vodă Vintilă, apparently records Mărăcine's involvement in the regicide of 1535.

=== Mărăcine as a Ronsard ===
==== Birth of the myth ====
The Ban is also the inspiration for a romantic myth involving the French poet Pierre de Ronsard. In his Elégie XX, first published in 1554, Ronsard imagined himself as the heir of a "Thracian" marquess. The pedigree, described as a "joke" by the erudite Alexandru Odobescu, contradicts another poem by Ronsard, where he fashions himself as being de nation germain ("of the German nation"). It also clashes with a 1586 oration by Jacques Davy Duperron, which depicts the Ronsards as Moravians. In 1844, the "Thracian" account was picked up by historian Jean Alexandre Vaillant, who argued that it was entirely based in fact, and who suggested that Ronsard meant to say he was Wallachian. This then inspired a Moldavian-born poet, Vasile Alecsandri, who identified Ronsard's legendary ancestor with Mărăcine, ignoring that Ronsard himself was born in 1524. He recorded his reading into an eponymous ballad, localized in the 14th century but otherwise heavily indebted to the Oltenian tradition about the 16th-century Ban.

Moreover, Alecsandri claimed that the story of Mărăcine's career in the Kingdom of France had been found in his folkloric source. Philologist Alexandru Ciorănescu, who doubts that Mărăcine even existed, sees the work as a sample of Alecsandri inventing tradition, as he had already done elsewhere. It remains "the strangest of all the so-called popular ballads of Alecsandri", in that "it enacts a false tradition that is not even R[o]manian". This is also noted by scholar Ion Donat, according to whom Alecsandri's Mărăcine was "substantially different" from the folkloric character. Donat, who established the connection between Mărăcine as a folkloric character and the historical Barbu III, also noted that "the local tradition of Dolj proved closer to reality than Ronsard's poetic whim."

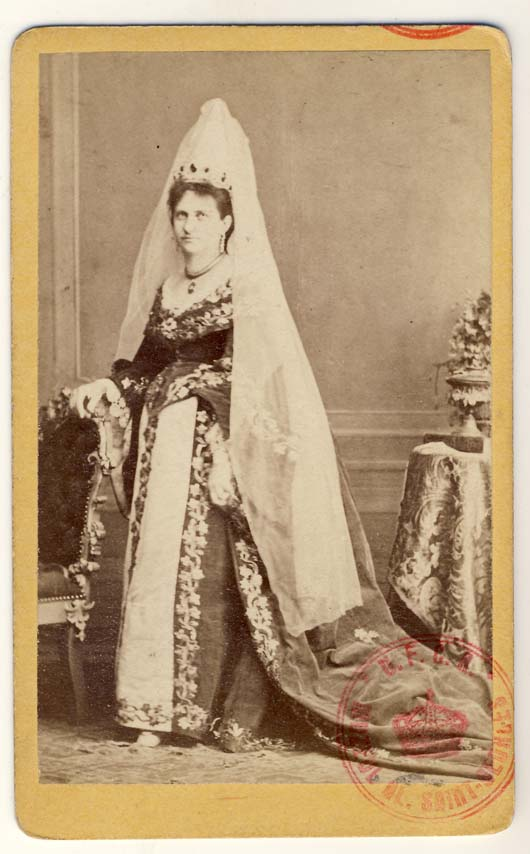
Matei Millo in travesti, appearing as a French lady in V. A. Urechia's Banul Mărăcine. Photograph by Carol Szathmari

In addition to picking up ideas from Vaillant, Alecsandri may have been inspired by the writer Gheorghe Asachi, who endorsed a version of the legend which identified Ronsard's ancestor with a "Romanian knight". Asachi believed that this figure was active ca. 1345, leading troops into battle in the Hundred Years' War. Published in French by Abdolonyme Ubicini (1855), Alecsandri's poem also functioned as propaganda, canvassing French support for the United Principalities. Over the following decades, it inspired other literary works, including an 1874 novella by N. D. Popescu-Popnedea and an 1878 historical drama, in verse, by V. A. Urechia. The latter premiered at the National Theater Bucharest for the benefit of Alsace-Lorraine refugees.

The myth was consolidated and enhanced after 1881, in the newly formed Kingdom of Romania. In 1889, Grigore H. Grandea published his novella Zâna Olteniei ("Oltenian Fairy"), part of which centers on Mărăcine. It backdated the narrative to the 12th-century Second Bulgarian Empire, showing Ivan Asen and Peter II as the lovers of Mărăcine's two daughters, and depicting one of the Ban's sons, Petru, as a refugee to France (as well as Ronsard's ancestor). By 1899, when recorded by critic George Ionescu-Gion, the story had it that a "Baldovin Mărăcine" had settled in France ca. 1320, before the very foundation of Wallachia, becoming Baudouin de Ronsard. A competing hypothesis, suggested by the heraldist Bogdan Petriceicu Hasdeu, argued that Ronsard truly had Romanian ancestors, but that these came from Bârlad, in Moldavia.

==== Ramifications ====
Alecsandri's modern legend was accepted as factual by Ronsard experts Achille de Rochambeau and Prosper Blanchemain, and credited in an intertextual poem by Anna de Noailles. In 1911, the Frenchman Rouët de Ceresnes, inspired by the legend, rewrote it as a novel, titled Le Chevalier de Ronsard et le Ban Maratchine. By then, the story had been denounced by the Romanian critic Constantin Al. Ionescu-Caion as a sample of "chauvinistic" Romanian nationalism, carried only by "insufficient proof". Although again debunked by Romanist Henri Longnon in 1912, it was still being viewed as a reliable hypothesis by Léo Claretie, who revisited the topic shortly before his death in 1924. He and other authors believed that the Ban had died in France in 1341. Claretie also viewed Ronsard as a cultured version of the Wallachian Lăutari.

The revisionist interpretation was also winning over adherents. A 1915 monograph by Alexandru Resmiriță showed that Alecsandri's derivation of Ronsard from ronce ("bramble", and therefore Mărăcine) was highly improbable. In 1927, researcher C. Radu concluded that Alecsandri had not only fabricated the story, but also his own genealogy, with an "obvious resemblance" between the two narratives: the fictitious Alecsandri patriarch was a Venetian knight. Historian Nicolae Iorga viewed Alecsandri's ballad a "youthful idiocy", although he concluded that Ronsard's claim to a "Thracian" origin was not entirely baseless. Similarly, scholar Mircea Eliade proposed that Ronsard, while unrelated to Mărăcine and Oltenia, could have taken his family name from the town of Râmnicu Sărat. In later decades, the myth was again revisited as a somewhat plausible account by scholars such as Frédéric Boyer (1965) and Elena Vulcănescu (2008)—the latter believes that Ronsard may have hailed from the Vlachs of Moravia. In January 1922, Elena Farago was announced as editor of an upcoming Banul Mărăcine magazine, put out from Craiova; during the interwar, poet Victor Eftimiu tried but failed to sell his screenplay, based on Alecsandri's myth, to producers at Pathé.

According to Ciorănescu, Alecsandri had managed to invent folklore: "this legend [of Banul Mărăcine] has become popular and is even sung and danced in certain rural circles." A dance routine known as Banul Mărăcine is described by Constantin Kirițescu as an "eminently athletic" and modern concept, one of several "arranged and stylized from folk elements". Musicologist Marțian Negrea identifies the melody as an ancient one, with one of its variants appearing in Johannes Caioni's 1652 anthology. The work was possibly first arranged in the 1850s, though Urechia's play had its own dance numbers, arranged by educator Gheorghe Moceanu. In the 1910 and '20s, Banul Mărăcine dances were still being performed in the Kingdom of Romania; according to one report from 1916, they were in fact named "for the Roumanian general who developed it in order to give his soldiers something to occupy their time during leisure hours." Sociologist Henri H. Stahl noted in 1939 that the dance routine had been created as a cabaret act by Moceanu, and came with fantasy Romanian costumes that were later adopted as authentic by Romania's urbanized peasants.

The myth still inspired Romanians to name things in honor of the Ban throughout the 20th century. In 1938, D. V. Barnoschi and Francis Lebrun put out the single-issue Ronsard journal, which featured Barnoschi's own hypotheses regarding the poet's supposed Romanian origins. "Banul Mărăcine" landmarks include a street in Timișoara, which took that name in the interwar years, and, from March 1944, a Romanian Railways station located southeast of Craiova. By 1965, a wine-producing region, centered on Pielești, had also adopted the name. Here, a secondary myth emerged, describing Mărăcine's Oltenian grapes as the source of Burgundy wine. A short adventure novel, also based on the earlier legend, was penned in 1967 by Grigore Băjenaru for Editura Tineretului company. By 1971, Băjenaru's text had also been turned into a spoken word album, at Electrecord. As part of the urban systematization occurring in Communist Romania during the 1970s, a new quarter, named "Banu Mărăcine", was attached to Curtea de Argeș.
