= Radu Paisie =

Radu VII Paisie (Petru I) Radul voievod(a) (Радул воєвода)
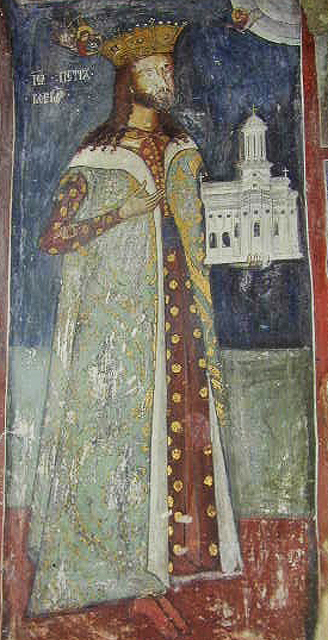
- Radu Paisie as ktitor. David and Radoslav's fresco in the infirmary of Cozia Monastery

Prince of Wallachia
- Reign: June 12, 1535 – February 1536?
- Predecessor: Vlad Vintilă de la Slatina
- Successor: Barbu Mărăcine?
- Reign: February 1536?–June 1539?
- Predecessor: Barbu Mărăcine?
- Successor: Șerban of Izvorani (as ispravnic)
- Reign: September 1539 – early 1544
- Predecessor: Șerban of Izvorani (as ispravnic)
- Successor: Stroe Florescu and Laiotă Basarab
- Reign: 1544 – February 1545
- Predecessor: Stroe Florescu and Laiotă Basarab
- Successor: Mircea the Shepherd
- Born: Petru (Пєтрȣ) c. 1500; Argeș County?
- Died: unknown date Alexandria or the Sinai, Egypt Eyalet
- Spouse: Stana (d. ca. 1535); Ruxandra (m. ca. 1535; d. ca. 1572)
- Issue: Marco; Vlad; Pătrașcu the Good? Maria; Cârstina
- Dynasty: Drăculești?
- Father: Radu the Great? Stanciul?
- Religion: Orthodox
- Occupation: Fishmonger, monk

Radu VII Paisie, officially Radul voievod(a) (Church Slavonic: Радул воєвода; Greek: Ῥαδουλ-Βοδα, romanized: Radul-Voda), also known as Radu vodă Măjescul, Radu vodă Călugărul, Petru I, and Petru de la Argeș (c. 1500 – after 1545), was Prince of Wallachia almost continuously from June 1535 to February 1545. A man of uncertain origins, he depicted himself as an heir to the House of Basarab and the Drăculești: the son of Prince Radu the Great and half-brother of Vlad Vintilă and Radu of Afumați. The scholar Nicolaus Olahus partly supported this account and further claimed that Paisie was his own cousin. The descent is endorsed by some modern historians, whereas others suggest that Paisie was a regular member of the boyar class, or even a fishmonger. He is known to have been a monk of the Wallachian Orthodox Church before his coronation.

Paisie took the throne as a boyar favorite in the wake of Vlad Vintilă's assassination. Despite his immediate homage to the Ottoman Empire, which exercised suzerain powers over Wallachia, some records suggest that he was chased out by the pretender Barbu Mărăcine, and possibly also maimed, by having his nose partly slashed, in early 1536. He returned to the country, possibly supported by the Eastern Hungarian Kingdom, and staged a bloody repression. He then reaffirmed his fealty to the Ottoman Sultan, Suleiman the Magnificent, and contributed to Suleiman's expeditions into Hungary. His repression of the boyars sparked new rebellions, which created two other brief interregnums: in 1539, Șerban of Izvorani established himself as regent; for two months in early 1544, Stroe Florescu and Laiotă Basarab took the capital, Târgoviște, but were defeated by Paisie at Fântâna Țiganului.

Possibly as thanks for their military support, Paisie ceded to the Ottomans the port of Brăila. Instead, following his raids into Transylvania, he was confirmed personal ownership of two inland citadels, Vințu de Jos and Vurpăr. Despite relying on Suleiman's support, Paisie also continued to entertain notions of emancipating Christendom and the Balkans from Ottoman rule, and in 1543 even signed to an alliance with the Habsburg Kingdom of Hungary. Rumors of this policy shift, and the intrigues of another claimant, Mircea the Shepherd, eventually caused Suleiman to depose him. This was done with careful planning, leaving Paisie unable to react before Mircea was in full control of Wallachia. Paisie was eventually exiled to Egypt Eyalet, where he spent the remainder of his life.

His two attested sons, including his co-ruler Marco, were either slaughtered by Mircea's family or Islamized at Suleiman's court. A possible third son, Pătrașcu the Good, came to rule Wallachia in the 1550s, between two of Mircea's reigns. This lineage would make Radu Paisie the grandfather of two other Princes, Petru Cercel and Michael the Brave. In cultural history, Paisie is remembered as the patron of Church Slavonic and one-time sponsor of the printer Dimitrije Ljubavić; as well as being the monarch who completed monastery complexes at Argeș, Cozia, Dealu, and Tismana. Through such enterprises, he and Marco elevated themselves to the fictional status of Eastern Orthodox protectors, contrasting their real-life subjugation to Suleiman.

== Biography ==
=== Origins ===
Radu Paisie's election to the throne was made possible by a collapse of public order and the fading out of the ruling dynasty, the House of Basarab. Wallachia's elective custom had always allowed sons born outside wedlock to contest the throne, creating the background for massacres among pretenders; in the 1500s, this strife was doubled by civil wars between factions of the boyar nobility. These backed individual pretenders in exchange for domination of the country's affairs. The conflicts were tolerated by the Ottoman Empire, which exercised suzerainty over Wallachia and neighboring Moldavia (the Danubian Principalities), throughout the Medieval era. The fall of Hungary in 1526 left both countries entirely controlled by the Sublime Porte.

Little is known about Radu Paisie's origins and early life, although it is often assumed that he was baptized as "Petru" and had a strong connection with Argeș County, in Muntenia. According to some reports, he was married to a Lady Stana. It is also known that he had a sister, Cârstina. A document issued by Michael the Brave implies that Paisie was a fishmonger, calling him Radu vodă Măjescul—"Radu Voivode of the Maja", from an obsolete measure of weight for fish. One more trusted account is that he was born into boyardom, and that, following his wife's death, he had taken orders at Argeș Monastery. Scholar Valentin Gheonea proposes that Petru was forced into monastic seclusion by Prince Vlad Vintilă de la Slatina, after an early attempt to seize the throne. Written tradition maintains that, while at Argeș, he was known as Hegumen Paisie. Church historian Ioan I. Rămureanu additionally notes that Petru was a monk at the same time as Varlaam, who served as Wallachian Metropolitan from at least 1536, and Anania, who succeeded Varlaam in 1544. Among the modern historians, Nicolae Iorga proposes that Paisie's monastic career may have begun earlier. He notes that one Paisie, who may be the same as the future Prince, was sent in 1522 on a church mission to the city of Corona, in Jagiellonian-ruled Transylvania.

In various other records, Paisie is treated as a Basarab family member. An early account by the scholar Nicolaus Olahus describes a Petrus ab Argyes, most likely the future Paisie, being born to a lesser Basarab, by the name of Stanciul (Stantzul). The latter, Olahus reports, was decapitated during one of Vlad the Impaler's three reigns in Wallachia, as an alleged conspirator against the throne. As historian Cornelia Popa-Gorjanu notes, this narrative would make Olahus and Paisie first cousins, and members of the Basarabs' Dănești branch. Olahus' text is endorsed by the literary historian Corneliu Albu, who further suggests that Olahus and Paisie may have corresponded with each other in Romanian.

Historian Constantin Rezachevici argues that Paisie and Olahus were not biological relatives: Paisie was indeed born to Stanciul's wife, but his natural father was Radu the Great, giving Paisie equal rights of succession. Scholars Cristina Feneșan and Jean-Louis Bacqué-Grammont record a letter of July 15, 1535, sent from the Eastern Hungarian Kingdom by John Zápolya; it notes that an unnamed son of Radu, "persuaded that the regnant voivode was a wrongdoer, took monastic orders and changed his appearance." Feneșan and Bacqué-Grammont identify this text as a reference to Paisie/Petru. Various other authors who credit Paisie as a Basarab see him as an heir of the rival Drăculești. They include historian Iorga, who accepts Paisie's claim to have been a natural son of Radu the Great. Popa-Gorjanu similarly concludes that "Petru of the Argeș was the son of Radu the Great, as attested in all writs and documents, and not the son of Stanciu, Olahus' uncle." By contrast, genealogist Constantin Gane credits Paisie as the son of Stanciul, and not as Radu's son. He further proposes that Paisie was more distantly related to the Drăculești, as a direct descendant from Vlad the Impaler.

=== Rise to power ===
In June 1535, the powerful Craiovești boyars and their allies staged Vlad Vintilă's assassination, then engineered Paisie's election to the throne. Upon his coronation on June 12, Paisie took the regnal name "Radu", underlining his supposed descent from Radu the Great. Historian Dan Pleșia also notes that "Petru was not a common name for Wallachian princes", and that "Radu" was a preferred new name for monarchs, down to the 17th-century Radu Șerban. Scholar Marcu Beza notes that Paisie still referred to himself under his birth name in the 1538 orarion carrying his dedication (part of the Victoria and Albert Museum collection). Iorga further notes that the item uses Пєтрȣ, indicating a Romanian Cyrillic spelling of the vernacular Petru, whereas the rest of the text uses Church Slavonic.

Paisie's claim to legitimacy was also enhanced by his regular donations to Meteora, a custom mostly associated with his presumed father. He then took as his new wife a Lady Ruxandra. According to various readings, she was a daughter of Neagoe Basarab and Princess Milica, having been previously married to Radu of Afumați, claimed by Paisie as his deceased brother. As a woman of exceptional beauty, in 1525 she had sparked a war between her suitors, pitting Radu of Afumați against a Moldavian Prince, Stephen IV. Art historian Pavel Chihaia supports the notion that, in marrying his former sister-in-law, Paisie had committed incest as defined in the Bible. A dissenting opinion is provided by scholar Stoica Nicolaescu, who argues that Paisie's Ruxandra "must not be confused" with her predecessor, who had by then remarried a rival claimant, Laiotă Basarab.

As noted by Iorga, Paisie's reign effectively united "in his person" the Drăculești and Dănești. Acting on his behalf, the Craiovești also sought confirmation from the Ottoman Sultan, Suleiman the Magnificent, to whom they sent a gift of 1 million akçeler. As they admitted in a collective letter, the boyars felt remorse for not having asked Suleiman's approval before the election, but also explained that this would have been difficult at a time when the suzerain was leading a war in the Middle East. Zápolya agreed to speak to Suleiman on behalf of the regicides, some of whom had found a temporary refuge in his Transylvanian lands. He also intervened on Paisie's behalf, informing Suleiman that the former monk was an "insignificant servant", who could be relied upon for preserving Wallachia in the Ottoman sphere of influence; on July 20, Paisie sent a letter to Zápolya in which he swore his fealty to Eastern Hungary and the Ottoman Empire. By November, Paisie had received his Ottoman banner and confirmation as belonging to the abode of peace. His regular tribute, the haraç, was set at a yearly sum of 12,000 scudi.

Aged about 40 at the time, Radu Paisie was the second former monk to obtain the Wallachian crown, preceded in this respect only by the 1480s Prince Vlad Călugărul. The latter's title, Călugărul (literally, "The Monk") is sometimes also applied to Radu Paisie. The new reign was "relatively long" by the period's standards, but "not a quiet one." As recorded by the musician and chronicler Hieronymus Ostermayer, Paisie began his reign as a figurehead who "let the boyars do as they pleased". His early efforts were directed toward increasing his personal wealth: in October 1535, he bought back from the destitute boyar Bădică several villages peopled entirely by Gypsy slaves, which subsequently became his "princely Gypsies".

This political line was soon changed by complex circumstances: the years 1536–1537 were anarchic. Having challenged his own retinue, Paisie faced boyar rebellions, which may have driven him out of Wallachia for much of that interval. The years also marked a split with the Craiovești, who put up a family member, Barbu Mărăcine, as their own candidate for the throne. According to Rezachevici, Mărăcine was the actual reigning Prince of Wallachia in February–April 1536, and had been recognized as such by the Porte. While she does not mention the usurper by name, Feneșan and Bacqué-Grammont argue that he was a favorite of Pargalı Ibrahim Pasha, the Ottoman Grand Vizier. Popa-Gorjanu similarly argues that Paisie "was chased out with Turkish assistance". Both she and Rezachevici record the story in Olahus, according to which "another pretender" had Petrus ab Argyes maimed, ordering the partial removal of his nose, before chasing him out of the country. According to Rezachevici, the mutilation may have been a "symbolic" cut on Paisie's septum, "as done to many other pretenders."

Feneșan and Bacqué-Grammont suggest that Paisie found sympathy at the Porte with the downfall of Vizier Ibrahim, who was finally replaced by Ayas Mehmed Pasha. As hypothesized by several authors, Paisie was able to reconquer Wallachia only with support from Zápolya and Stephen Majláth, the Voivode of Transylvania, driving his loyalist troops in from the north. Among the primary sources, Olahus claimed that his cousin was in Transylvania during the exile interval. Paisie was then able to re-consolidate his power, turning to violent repression. Some records describe other smaller revolts, which are not located chronologically; one was led by another pretender, Ivan Viezure, whom Paisie captured and decapitated, possibly in 1537. Victims of his revenge included Tudor of Drăgoești, the country's Logothete, and Ban Toma of Pietroșani. Boyars on the loyalist side were led by Vlaicu Piscan, who took over as Logothete, Clucer Coadă, and Vornic Staico Șintescu, as well as Radu Furcovici, who held various commissions and was Paisie's godson. At the end of this punitive expedition, Mărăcine was chased out of the land. His later life gave rise to many legends. According to Rezachievici, the most plausible one is that he was quietly murdered in Istanbul in 1565, being survived by his son, the pretender Nicolaus Bassaraba.

=== 1530s consolidation ===
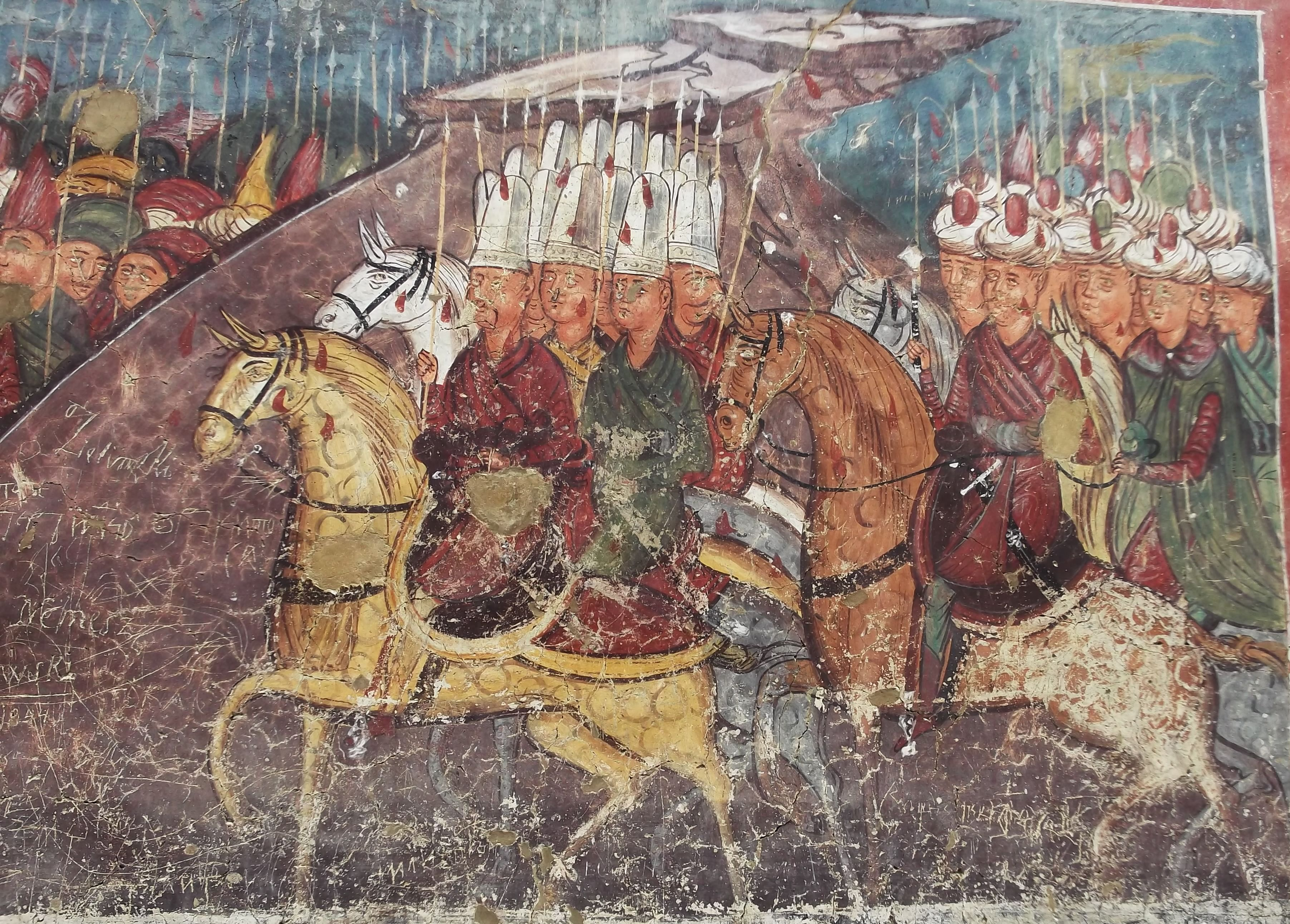
Mural of Ottoman Army soldiers, at Petru Rareș's Moldovița Monastery

Paisie had returned on the throne in Bucharest by July 17, 1536, when he granted Snagov Monastery an annual donation "from my highness' own granary". He now focused some of his activity on competing with the boyars for possession of land, some of which he then distributed among his family and retinue. He owned 73 villages to his name, the largest single domain since Mircea I's (before 1418); 22 of these were bought from the boyars and at least 7 were inherited from Neagoe, while another 13 were confiscated from disobedient subjects. His sister received most of Islaz village and the whole of Fălcoiu, purchased by Paisie from a Marga Craioveasca of Caracal; Furcovici and his wife Caplea were similarly granted Bistreț. Boyars earned Paisie's favors with land donations at Sfințești and Fetești, which also went to the princely family. In 1538, Paisie himself confiscated the Teleorman estates of an older pretender, Radu Bădica, including perhaps the whole of Viișoara. He donated these to his courtiers, Drăghici and Udriște. These and other loyalists, including Detco of Brâncoveni, received a large portion of the Craiovești inheritance, presumably confiscated by Paisie from his rivals.

The next period restated Prince Radu's formal allegiance to the Ottomans, whose continued backing he needed; he "never rattled a sword against [them]." According to various records, he was still scheming against Suleiman at every opportunity: as early as July 1536, Božidar Vuković "della Vecchia" boasted having met the Prince of Wallachia in Istanbul, where they discussed freeing Wallachia and the Balkans. It remains disputed whether this refers to Paisie or to a rival pretender. The following year, Paisie's Wallachian army, led by a new Ban, Șerban of Izvorani, participated in the Ottoman expedition into Hungary. In August 1538, Paisie himself took charge of the 3,000-strong expeditionary corps that assisted an Ottoman invasion of Moldavia, which was designed to punish Moldavian Prince Petru Rareș for his insubordination. Historian Tahsin Gemil notes that the troops were merely "sent by Radu Paisie". As reported by Gemil, they followed Suleiman northwards to Fălciu, and contributed to the war effort which resulted in Rareș's submission.

In 1540, the Ottoman-friendly Zápolya granted his Wallachian neighbor ownership of two Transylvanian citadels, Vințu de Jos and Vurpăr; the exact circumstances for this territorial gift remain disputed. As early as 1538, Paisie also expressed some regret over such alliances, writing to the burghers of Hermannstadt that the "infidel Turk" needed to be defeated. In the same letter, written shortly before the Moldavian campaign, he proposed a union of Christians around "a single concept and a single faith". Overall, however, he attempted to obtain from the leaders of Hermannstadt a guarantee that they would not rebel against "our master" Zápolya. As argued by scholar Nicolae Grigoraș, Paisie attempted to pass himself off as a supporter of the "Zápolyan party in Transylvania", while secretly harboring "anti-Turkish sentiments". The expeditionary corps, Grigoraș argues, was "auxiliary", less than what Wallachia could muster.

By June 1539, Paisie found himself at odds with Șerban of Izvorani. The latter may have obtained control of the country, describing himself as a regent, or ispravnic of the throne. Historians are divided over which family led the uprising, with some proposing a Craiovești insurgency, and others pointing to Paisie's conflict with the Florescu family. Șerban was in any case aided by the Drăgoești boyars, Radu, Pârvu and Vlad, as well as by Giura, the former Logothete. Again faced with an insurgency, Paisie departed for Istanbul, where Suleiman reconfirmed him as a Prince. He returned to Wallachia alongside an Ottoman emissary, charged with restoring order. His return pushed the boyars, including Șerban, to take flight in Ottoman lands, where Giura spent the rest of his life. In September 1539, one of Paisie's writs donated to the Bishops of Buzău the village of Pârscov, which he had confiscated from the rebel Barbu. Eventually, Paisie persuaded Suleiman to order Șerban captured and killed, for rea hiclenie ("evil treason"). This is believed to have happened at some point before June 1543, although other readings of the same sources suggest that he was still alive by then. The office of Ban went to a boyar Pravăț, who was serving as such in April 1543.

These and other clashes overlapped with a "great famine", so severe that it reportedly pushed Wallachians to sell their children into Ottoman slavery. Moreover, they resulted in the annexation of Brăila, a lucrative Wallachian port on the Danube, to the Ottoman Empire. Described in some records as an éminence grise, Coadă may have played a "decisive role" in this affair, thanking the Ottomans for their support against Șerban's party. Paisie was one of the last Wallachian rulers to maintain a capital at Târgoviște (creating it as a seat for Varlaam and his Wallachian Metropolis), though he also continued to reside in Bucharest. The slow transition signaled a shift in Ottoman priorities, from northern Muntenia, with its Transylvanian commitments, to a new city closer to the Ottoman garrison at Giurgiu (Yergöğü). It was also a move "from the mountains to the open plains and from the north to the south, nearer the imperial frontier, where [the Princes] be more easily controlled." Already in 1536, Paisie is attested as having maintained his own house in Istanbul.

By late 1540, Paisie was intervening in the Hungarian civil war, as an emissary of the Sultan. In that context, he tried to dissuade Transylvanian nobles from supporting Stephen Majláth, who had rebelled, and from swearing loyalty to the Habsburg Kingdom of Hungary. Unable to act when the Ottoman Army passed through Wallachia on its way to punish Majláth, he send a word of warning to the burghers of Corona that they should prepare for a siege; Corona then relayed his warning to the Transylvanian court. As another sign of Ottoman submission, Paisie and Rareș staged their own invasion of Transylvania in June 1541, peaking with a devastating raid on Székely Land. Moldavian military forces were the bulk of the invading army, namely 12,000 soldiers—as compared to 6,000 provided by Paisie, and only 200 by Malkoçoğlu Bali Bey; in July 1542, the latter two joined up with Rareș's armies in Orbaiszék. The two Princes had a polite correspondence, with Rareș addressing his Wallachian counterpart as "great and honored tsar"—although, as noted by Nicolaescu, the title was meaningless.

The campaign of Transylvania came to an end later in July, when the Ottoman vassals besieged Majláth at Făgăraș Citadel. Paisie and Rareș then captured Majláth, who was then either executed by Suleiman or allowed to live the remainder of his life as a prisoner in Galata. In August, Paisie had made his way back to Târgoviște. By April 1542, he had left for Oltenia and was again heading into Hungary. According to Gheonea, it was for this service in Transylvania that he received ownership Vințu de Jos and Vurpăr. His contribution was also rewarded by the authorities of Corona, who presented him with 200 florins as a gift; this was ten times less than what they awarded Rareș, and five times less than Balı Bey's share.

=== Habsburg alliance and Stroe's rebellion ===
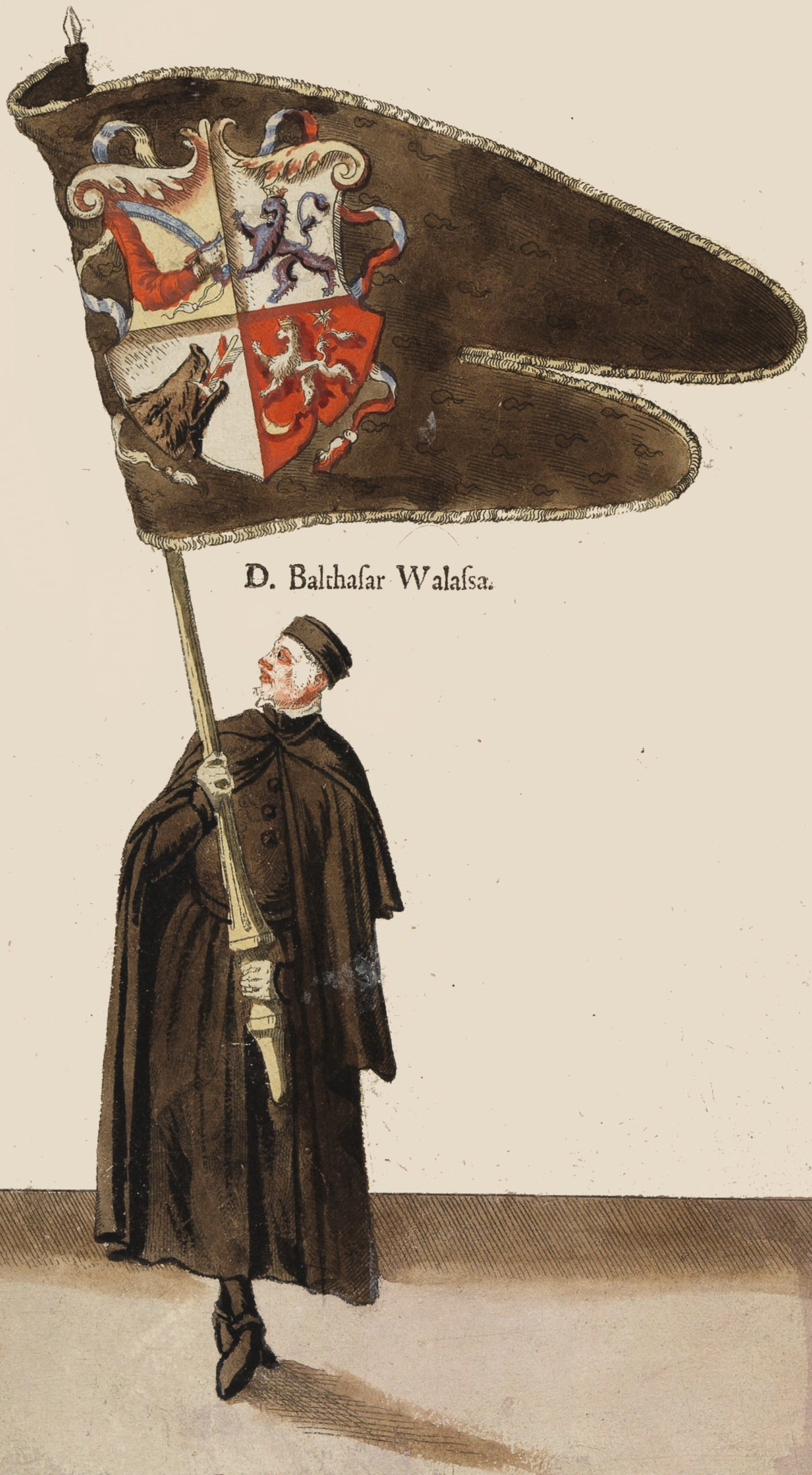
Banner signaling Ferdinand I's claim to Wallachia; carried by Boldizsár Balassa at Ferdinand's funeral in 1565

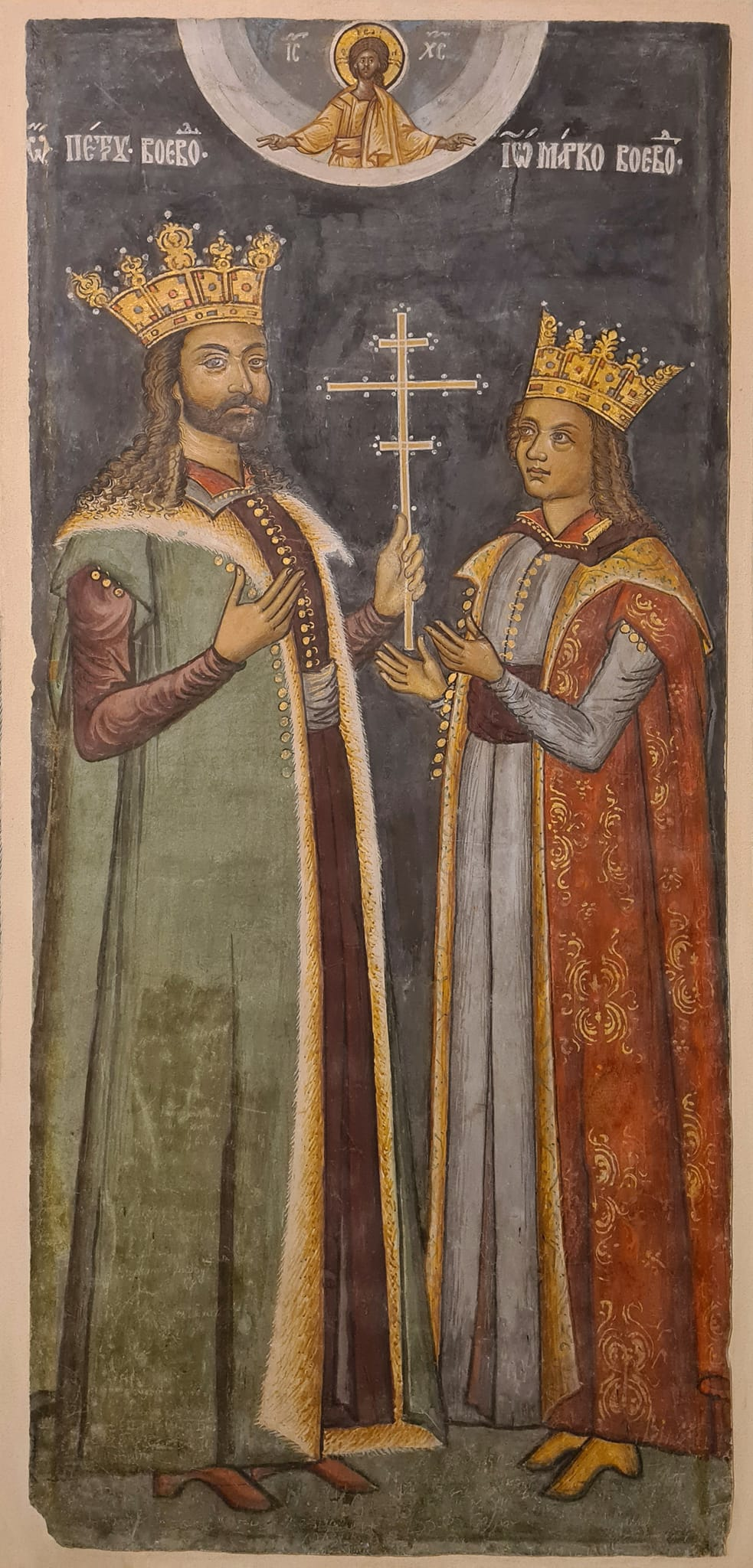
Paisie and his son Marco. Argeș Monastery fresco from the 1550s

Already in late 1541, Paisie was contemplating joining a Christian alliance against the Ottomans. This was acknowledged by Rareș's envoy to Poland, Avram Banilovschi. His report, rendered by Mikołaj Sieniawski, was that "my master, along with his neighbor the Wallachian prince, would more readily side with Christendom than with the pagans". In January 1542, Piotr Gamrat wrote about efforts mounted by the Electorate of Saxony to form an anti-Ottoman league around Ferdinand I and the Hungarian Habsburgs. Its leading component was to be Poland, assisted by Wallachia and Moldavia—the latter two, Gamrat claimed, would provide a combined army 40,000-strong. Isabella's policy of neutrality, crafted by George Martinuzzi, was directly threatened by the Moldavian and Wallachian intrigues. During 1542, Martinuzzi sent envoys to Rareș, trying to persuade him from invading Transylvania. At the time, both Rareș and Paisie, discovering that the anti-Ottoman armies were not battle-ready, decided to postpone their planned expedition.

Paisie then participated in diplomatic maneuvers which were meant to conceal Rareș's preparation for an anti-Ottoman strike. They played up the Ottomans' suspicion toward Eastern Hungary, which was ruled at the time by Zápolya's widow, Isabella Jagiellon: Rareș complained to the Porte that Isabella intended to invade Moldavia from Transylvania, with Polish help; Paisie informed Isabella of this, advising her to openly deny that she had any such plans—in March 1542, Isabella heeded his advice, but the intrigue served to persuade Suleiman that Rareș was loyal to him. In his letters to Isabella, Paisie also described the Franco-Ottoman alliance and circulated rumors of a resumption of war in Ottoman Hungary; in parallel, Paisie informed Joachim of Brandenburg that Suleiman was not in fact ready for a war. As noted by historian Marian Coman, Paisie's letters also suggest that he increasingly viewed Transylvania as separate within Isabella's realm, referring to its leader as the "Voivode from Transylvania" (воєвода ѡт Ардѣл), rather than the more traditional "Transylvanian Voivode".

During the first half of 1543, the Ottomans were confident that Paisie and Rareș would support their attempt to conquer all of Hungary and contain Ferdinand. In February, the Sultan himself informed the Transylvanian Diet that they should be prepared to assist Paisie as he returned with his army to besiege Esztergom; Venetian sources circulated rumors that 15,000 Wallachian soldiers were standing by to assist Suleiman. In fact, Paisie was courting both sides, and preparing for either scenario. On January 7, 1543, he had signed a secret alliance treaty with Ferdinand. This document, in Renaissance Latin, effectively recognized Wallachia as part of the Hungarian Kingdom in its Habsburg version. As noted by Rezachevici, such efforts were largely perfunctory: "after 1542 it was no longer feasible to mount an effective anti-Ottoman alliance, as the king [Ferdinand I] was incapable of acting against Suleiman". Historian Léon Lamouche similarly writes that Pope Paul III's advocacy in favor of a league that would have involved Paisie and Rareș failed: "as is usually the case, reality did not meet one's expectations."

A retaliation from Isabella and Martinuzzi's Transylvanian territories, crucially assisted by the Banate of Lugos and Karánsebes, soon followed. It was prepared by the Paharnic Stroe Florescu (known in historical records as Stroe Pribeagul, "the Outcast"). A former ally and cousin of Șerban, Stroe had exiled himself after the 1539 debacle. In early 1544, he returned to Wallachia at the helm of an anti-Ottoman army, alongside Laiotă Basarab. According to the 18th-century writer Constantin Filipescu, Târgoviște was taken, and Paisie had to escape into Rumelia Eyalet, at Nikopol. Other historians back this account: the insurgents had full control of Wallachia for two months, according to Irina F. Cîrstina, or one month, according to Matei Cazacu. It remains disputed whether it was Laiotă or Stroe who claimed the princely title, or whether the throne was left vacant. One version suggests that Stroe ruled over Oltenia as Ban, while Laiotă was Prince.

=== Final return and expulsion ===
Eventually, Paisie's adversaries faced Wallachia's army at a place called Fântâna Țiganului ("The Gypsy's Fountain"), identified as a mineral well outside Găiseni, west of Bucharest. The rebels were defeated; both Stroe and Laiotă were executed, with the former being buried at Strâmbu-Găiseni Monastery. Vlaicu Piscan, who had joined them in the plot, and Stanciu of Pietroșani were also recorded as "slaughtered" in the aftermath. Furcovici had an essential role in returning Paisie to his throne, and, for this service, was made owner of Poenari Castle and Căpățâneni. One document suggests that Stroe had twice invaded Wallachia from the north, and therefore that there were two distinct battles of Fântâna Țiganului. Gheonea argues that the source, which pushes Laiotă's claim back to 1537, must be a forgery, of a "frequent kind in that era." Researcher N. Stoicescu also advanced 1544 as the date of the battle, although also noting that some records have 1542. Spiridon Cristocea and his colleagues date the battle to October 1544; they also note that Piscan's betrayal is still commemorated in the eponymous village of Piscani, where the area once housing his manor was still known in 2012 as Locul Iudei ("Judas' Place").

During this final part of his reign, Paisie traveled extensively: on November 7, 1543, he issued documents from two locations—Murcenii lui Puia near Balta Ialomiței, and Orașul de Floci; the latter town had replaced Brăila as Wallachia's leading port. Nine of Paisie's writs and rulings have survived from the year 1544—including one from October 6, which assigned Cunești and two families of Gypsy slaves to Stan Papa. Also that year, Coadă had been appointed Vornic and dispatched to Giurgiu—possibly in order to concede more territory to the Ottoman Empire in that area, just south of Bucharest. The year also saw a new increase in Ottoman demands from Wallachia, with local shepherds being expected to contribute 100,000 sheep as tribute to Istanbul, in exchange for access to its markets. At the time, the Sultan still viewed Paisie as the Ottoman representative in his relations to Rila Monastery, in Rumelia.

In June 1544, Suleiman heard a complaint by Prochorus, the Archbishop of Ohrid, according to whom Paisie was making it difficult for him to collect past dues from the Wallachian Church. Since this meant a reduction of the overall haraç, Suleiman ordered Paisie to press the Metropolitan (either Varlaam or Anania) into compliance. Iorga also mentions a document, which he dates to September 1544, whereby Paisie confiurmed donations to the Buzău bishops—read by Iorga as the bishopric's actual foundation. Although Paisie had by then resumed control of his country, a more powerful contender for his throne arrived on the scene. This was Mircea the Shepherd, nominally Paisie's half-brother, who lived in Istanbul and periodically bribed the Grand Vizier, Rüstem Pasha, to obtain his support. The competition became tense in December 1544, when Paisie was ordered to send his eldest son, Marco or Marcu, who was by then his nominal co-ruler, as an hostage to the Porte. He failed to deliver within the required interval, which alerted the Ottomans that he was plotting a revolt. Suleiman prepared his ouster, making sure that Mircea would be able to occupy the throne before Paisie could "abscond with the treasury". Other authors suggest that the Ottomans had learned about Paisie's Habsburg alliance, which thus contributed to his ouster.

Paisie entered history as "the first prince [of Wallachia] to be deposed and exiled at the sultan's pleasure." The corresponding firman for his dethronement was dated February 22, 1545, precisely as Mircea was reentering Wallachia. According to Gheone, the most precise dating for his removal is "late February", which revises an earlier consensus, based on Mircea's first known writ, and which has "March 25" as the relevant date. Paisie was escorted into the Ottoman Empire, but allowed to keep some of his wealth. Confident that he could still regain the throne, he sent Suleiman a gift of 500,000 akçeler, and made various donations to the monasteries on Mount Athos. His efforts were curbed when he was exiled to Egypt Eyalet, where he spent the rest of his life, dying at an unknown date. Iorga argues that his burial place must be a parish church of the Byzantine Patriarchate of Alexandria. Gane also writes that Paisie died in Alexandria. Other records suggest that his destination and resting place was the Sinai, making him the first Wallachian or Moldavian Prince to have set foot in the peninsula.

== Legacy ==
=== Descendants ===
After installment, Mircea offered rewards to Paisie's prominent rivals, the Drăgoești family. Staico Șintescu, who lost his high rank under the new regime, remained a prominent supporter of the deposed Prince, as did Radu Furcovici, who was driven into exile. In 1546, Mircea put to death Clucer Coadă and his brother Radu, while forcing Coadă's children to take refuge in Transylvania. Metropolitan Anania also seems to have fled to Transylvania, alongside Paisie's putative mother-in-law, Princess Milica. The new monarch tried to coax other Paisie loyalists into returning, sending Barbu of Pietroșani, orphaned son of Toma, to bribe them. The effort was a failure, but so were the exiles' various attempts to remove Mircea. Over the following months, Mircea's violence lost him the support of his own boyars. In 1547, Barbu and the Drăgoești absconded with Wallachia's haraç money and became wanted men. Barbu was ultimately delivered by the Ottomans to Bucharest, where he was executed in April 1548. By then, both the Paisie exiles and Wallachia had lost control of Prince Radu's Transylvanian estates, which became George Martinuzzi's own demesne.

Lady Ruxandra's fate is generally unknown. A woman identified as Neagoe's daughter was still attested as living Wallachia—she was spared by the new regime, being recognized as owner of Găneasa. One document, issued in 1572, suggests that Ruxandra had continued to reside in Wallachia to her death. The inscription on her putative grave omits her name, possibly as punishment for her alleged incest with Paisie. It is also not precisely known what became of Paisie's designated heir, Marco, or of his brother Vlad. In 1554–1557, between two of Mircea's reigns, the Wallachian throne was taken by a Pătrașcu the Good, who styled himself "son of Radu Paisie". A period document suggests that Paisie had recognized his issue, personally granting Pătrașcu ownership of Segarcea. One theory suggests that "Pătrașcu" was Marco's regnal name. However, Paisie and Marco appear side by side in an Argeș Monastery fresco presumed to have been completed in the 1550s, on Pătrașcu's orders. According to Gane, Pătrașcu was a legitimate son, born to Paisie's first wife, Stana; if this is the case, then through his marriage he became a posthumous son in law of Toma of Pietroșani, his father's enemy.

This reconciliation was also signaled by other dynastic intermarriages, including that between Paisie's daughter Maria and Balea of Pietroșani. Other sources note that Paisie had a Muslim son, Mehmed, who pleaded with Suleiman to be granted an estate (timar). This is possibly Marco or Vlad, after having accepted Islam. Yet another hypothesis is that Vlad survived in Wallachia to ca. 1560, when he was put to death by Mircea's son Peter the Younger, possibly by request of his mother, Doamna Chiajna. Nicolaescu proposes that, in all, Paisie had three sons, Marco, Vlad and Pătrașcu, as well as two daughters, Maria and Cârstina. His nieces through the other Cârstina were Rada, married into the boyar clan of Fălcoiu, and Anca-Badea.

If Pătrașcu's claim was truthful, Radu Paisie may have also been the posthumous grandfather of Princes Petru Cercel and Michael the Brave. According to Cîrstina, the "circle of power, formed around the family of Radu Paisie", was active in obtaining the throne for both of his presumed grandsons. However, Filipescu doubts Michael's claim and the legends associated with it, noting that "no historian of ours (or foreign) attests as to who he was or how he took the throne". According to an early assessment by Iorga, Michael was born to Pătrașcu's paramour, Teodora, rather than to Princess-consort Voica; this account was backed by other scholars. In contrast, Nicolaescu underlined that, beyond all doubt, Teodora was Pătrașcu's legal wife. Dan Pleșia also endorses the Radu—Pătrașcu—Michael genealogy. Moreover, he argues that another son of Prince Radu had heirs, which included Radu Florescu, who was at once Michael's Clucer, confidant, uncle and in-law.

=== Church-building ===
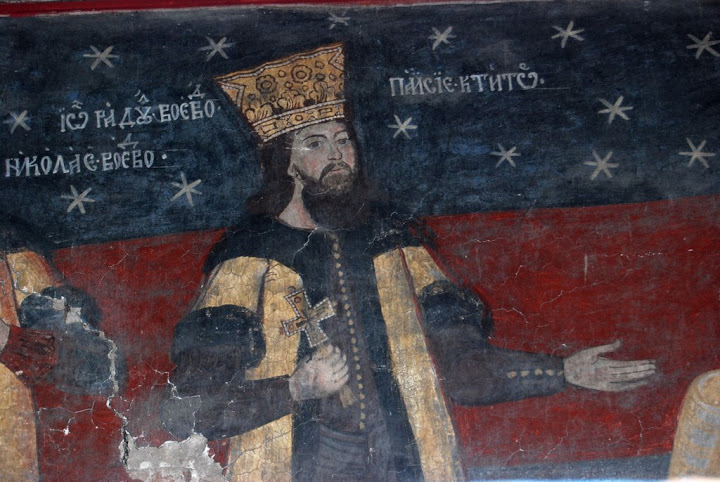
Paisie in an 18th-century mural at his Gura (Valea) Monastery

Scholar V. Brătulescu writes that Paisie's contribution as a founder of churches (ktitor) may have begun before he was enthroned, with the establishment of Gura (or Valea) Monastery, outside Țițești. However, he proposes that the building was more likely finished in 1544, with murals done under Mircea the Shepherd, and redone even later; Gura's co-ktitors were the three lords of Piscani: the future dissident Vlaicu Piscan, alongside his brothers Mihail and Badea. All their contributions are rendered uncertain by a misdated pisanie, which credits Paisie as a ktitor in 1535, at a time when he was not on the throne. A nearby tomb belonging to the Piscans' matriarch Anisia has Vlaicu's name chiseled out, possibly signifying Paisie's attempt at damnatio memoriae. Filipescu mainly records Paisie as ktitor of Mislea Monastery, now in Scorțeni, though a record from ca. 1620 suggests that the institution was in fact founded by "his parents". Mislea was a prime recipient of estates from Paisie, including areas of Brebu, Călugăreni, and Cornu, as well as, to the south, Căscioarele and Greaca. Several were confiscated back by Mircea Ciobanul.

As noted by art historian Liviu Marius Ilie, Paisie and Marco both tried to compensate for Ottoman subjugation by investing in their role at patrons of Orthodoxy. Ilie identifies this aspect in the infirmary of Cozia Monastery, which the two built; in the frescoes, Paisie, identified as "Petru", is blessed by Jesus Christ, with angels crowning him and Marco together. He is pictured holding up a small replica of the monastery, which, scholar Gheorghe Balș notes, is sufficiently accurate to help with reconstructing Cozia as it looked in the 1540s. Painted in large part by masters David and Radoslav, the infirmary is mentioned by historian Vasile Drăguț among the last Wallachian monuments attributable to high Byzantine art, one with highlights of "great preciousness." The stonemasonry, credited to one "Master Maxim", has likely origins in Serbian art, and may highlight Paisie's family connections with the Branković dynasty. The murals show both Princes and Ruxandra alongside Cozia's administrator, Stroe, whose portrait evades the Byzantine canon and is regarded as one of the first realistic works in Romanian art. The ensemble also features the only known local take on The Incredulity of Thomas.

Various period sources indicate that the Prince redirected the wine tribute owed by Pitești toward maintaining a monastery at Stănești. The church in that village is also a noted monument of medieval art, financed by the future rebel, Logothete Giura, in 1537. Historians note its frescoes as a main development on the path to a rural realism which became dominant after 1700. However, the work may be a retouching of earlier murals, from before Paisie's day. Its preserved layer is attributed to an Eratudi, possibly from Crete, or to a master Dumitru.

Paisie was the re-builder of Tismana Monastery, and, Iorga notes, introduced there massive borrowings from the more architecturally advanced churches of Moldavia: the brickwork of Tismana appears to have been based on Khotyn Fortress, as completed under Petru Rareș. Contributions from Paisie's era also include the Tismana doorway, carved in 1542. It is one of the rare examples in Wallachian medieval stone-carving, ultimately inspired by the art of khachkars. According to Iorga, Paisie emphasized his Basarab legitimacy by completing work on the monasteries of Argeș and Dealu, where he "dreamed of being buried." This effort also left an imprint in Paisie's legacy abroad. A tower at Dionysiou Monastery carries a carving mentioning "Petru Voivode" as the sponsor—which may mean either Paisie or Petru Rareș. In addition to sponsoring Meteora and Mount Athos, he contributed, from 1540, to the upkeep of Saint Catherine's Monastery in the Sinai.

=== Language, literature, historiography ===
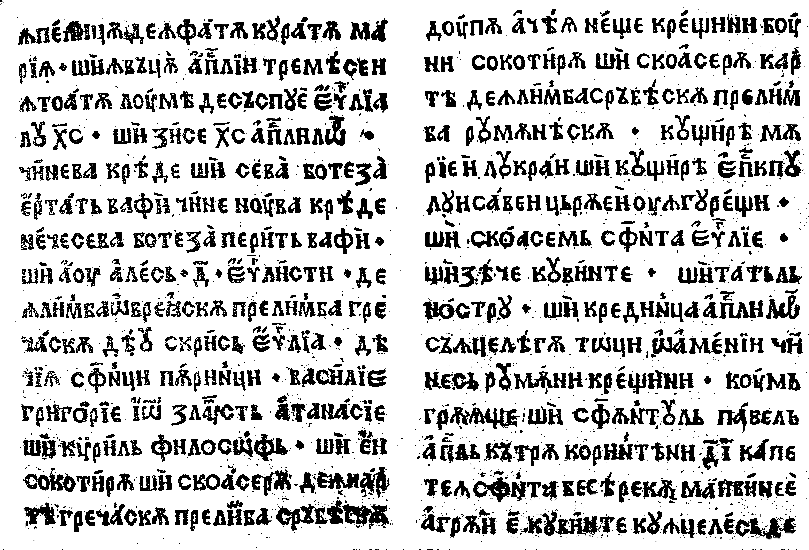
Luther's Small Catechism in Romanian Cyrillic; introductory pages mentioning "Romanian Christians" (рꙋмѫни крєщини) and "the Romanian tongue" (лимба рꙋмѫнѣскѫ). Facsimile of Coresi's copy from Filip Moldoveanul's print

During his ten-year reign, Paisie revived Wallachian printing, which still used Church Slavonic rather than preserving the attested vernacular. This reflected his patronage of Serb craftsmen from the Republic of Venice and the Sanjak of Bosnia, including Božidar Vuković and of Božidar Goraždanin's nephew, Dimitrije Ljubavić. Bibliologist Agnes Terezia Erich proposes that, by relocating Ljubavić's press to Târgoviște in 1544, Paisie inaugurated "artisan printing in Wallachia"; however, the enterprise itself was entirely private, the first non-public press in the history of Romania. As Iorga notes, his Early Cyrillic, introduced by Ljubavić for various prayer books, was inferior to the type used in previous decades; the illustrations, instead, were "rather beautiful". The impact of Slavonic as a state language remained high, even though occasionally challenged by Greek. According to archivist Aurelian Sacerdoțeanu, the penetration of Greek at Paisie's court was overestimated because of a single text which survived in Greek translation. The rediscovery of its Slavonic original toned down that claim, although "one could still write in Greek in Wallachia at that time."

Under Paisie, Wallachia built bridges, political as well as cultural, with the Transylvanian Saxons, including through his letters to the burghers of Hermannstadt. One of these asks for a "well trained and learned scribe", presumably one who could read and write in Renaissance Latin, and promises candidates a hefty pay. In 1539, Hieronymus Ostermayer visited the Wallachian court and performed there his samples of Renaissance music. Other attempts at closer contacts failed. In the 1540s, the city of Corona asked Paisie to expel Ottoman Greeks from Wallachian territory, viewing them as commercial competitors. Paisie declined, writing that such a move would displease "our lord, the exalted emperor" Suleiman. As noted by historian Dinu C. Giurescu, this message, ending in "stop them yourselves if you can do so", summarized Paisie's "impotence in curbing the activity of south-Danubian commercial agents." There were also sustained Saxon attempts to spread the Reformation among Transylvanian and Wallachian Romanians. Luther's Small Catechism was translated and circulated in Romanian in Filip Moldoveanul's print of 1544, but, Iorga writes, "had no impact either on that side [of the border] or on this one."

The chronological fragmentation of Paisie's reign, and the multiple names and titles he used, resulted in confusion in some later annals and chronicles. A handwritten list from 1701 describes two separate Princes, as Hegumen Radu and Paise [sic] Prib[e]agul ("Paise the Outcast"), within an incorrect succession. In the 1850s, essayist Richard Kunisch recorded Paisie as reigning in 1536–1546, and hypothesized that he had died as a monk, after being deposed. The confusions also surfaced in later historiography. In 1895, philologist Émile Picot argued that the name "Petru" referred to Petrașcu, and concluded that by 1544 Paisie had ceded his throne to his putative son. Gane also writes that the reason behind Paisie's ouster had to with his involvement in the death of Alvise Gritti, an Ottoman favorite, which had occurred in 1534. Another error, which was only debunked in 1941, described Paisie as fighting against the pretender Drăghici Gogoașă, who was already dead in 1530. The erroneous dating of one document, since corrected, had also left some scholars, including Ioan C. Filitti, to propose that Paisie had actually reigned briefly in 1534, before Vlad Vintilă's assassination.

The advent of Romanian nationalism in the 19th century also rendered Paisie into an unpalatable historical figure. The cession of Brăila is traditionally depicted in Romanian historiography as Paisie's worst doing. However, according to Gheonea, it may have been inevitable, given "the balance of forces and the Ottoman interest in controlling the Danube". Another historian, Ștefan Andreescu, argues that Suleiman annexed Brăila precisely as revenge for Paisie's earlier involvement in anti-Ottoman intrigues. As noted in 1996 by Magazin Istoric, Paisie, unlike other Princes, never had a monograph published on him under the Romanian communist regime (1948–1989). The review proposes that this is because Paisie failed to rise to the national-communist standards. Paisie's reign was nevertheless a subject matter for the 1976 novel Cînd au venit Neagoe Vodă, by Emanoil Copăcianu.

== Arms ==
Radu Paisie was one of a succession of princes who consolidated the use of the Wallachian arms, depicting a bird of solid color in various positions. During that interval in its history, the animal was consciously depicted as "hybrid", maintaining elements of the golden eagle and some features which suggest a raven. The emblem is featured, with a web of knotted lines, on Ljubavić's printed editions. The design was only standardized to match heraldic norms under Prince Pătrașcu, who was inspired by Renaissance art. The other heraldic device used in tandem on Paisie's seals was a variation of the theme called plantatio nova ("new plantation") by historians and heraldists, beginning with V. A. Urechia. The latter work features two human figures, the Prince and his (first-born) son, in full regalia, on either side of a tree. It was introduced in this form by Radu the Fair in the 1460s, and attested on at least two impressions of seals used by Paisie.

In Western armorials of the 1530s and later, Wallachia was mistakenly attributed a lion—the origin of this symbol may be with a misreading of a manuscript by Ulrich of Richenthal, or may originate with a tradition regarding Cumania. Ferdinand I's funeral in 1565 featured a banner of the arms of "Wallachia" with a lion—though, as noted by historian Géza Pállfy, these may more generally refer to Ferdinand's claim over all of Cumania.

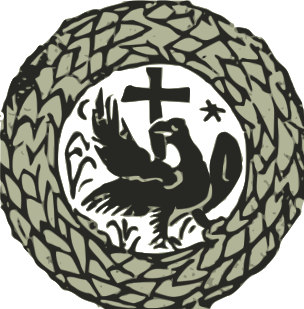
"Hybrid" Wallachian bird, as designed by Dimitrije Ljubavić's printing press

Plantatio nova seal, variant used by Paisie's alleged father, Radu the Great

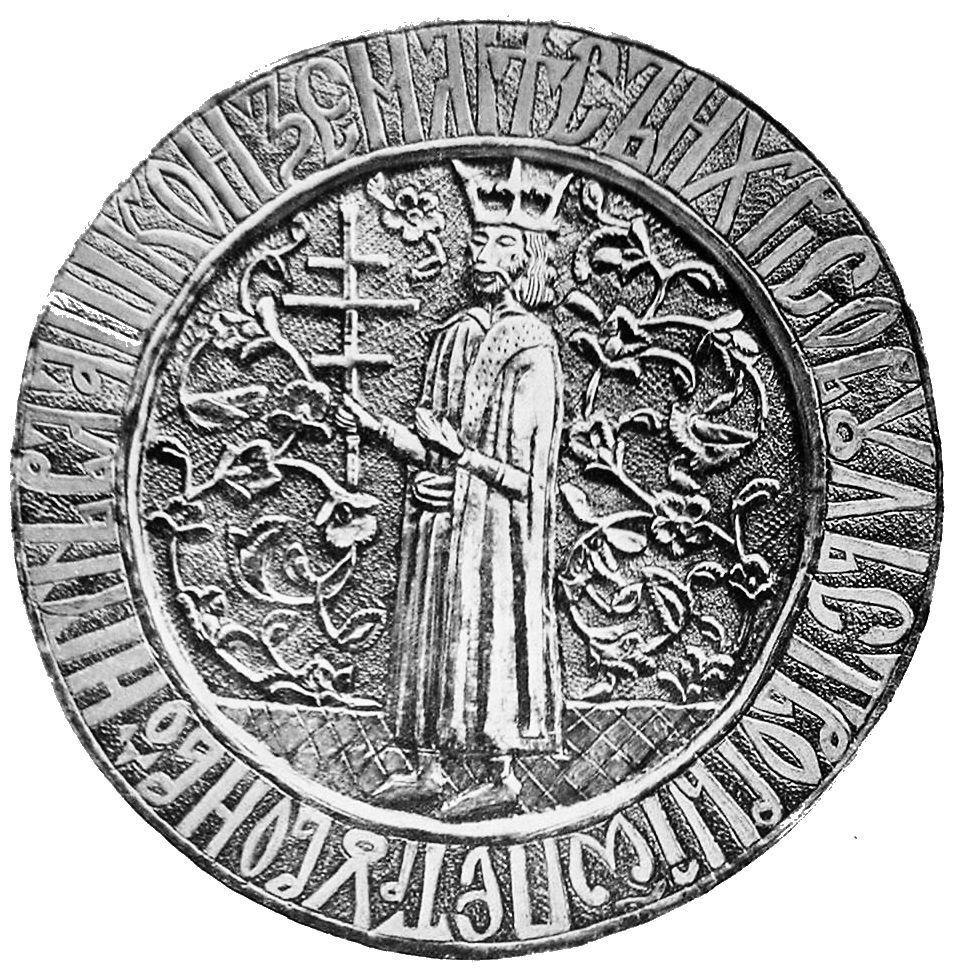
Paisie's other seal, depicting him alone

== Notes ==
Radu Paisie House of Drăculești? Born: ca. 1500 Died: ?
Regnal titles
Preceded by Vlad Vintilă de la Slatina	Prince of Wallachia; June 12, 1535 – February 1536?	Succeeded by Barbu Mărăcine
Preceded by Barbu Mărăcine	Prince of Wallachia; February 1536? – June 1539?	Succeeded by Șerban of Izvorani (as ispravnic)
Preceded by Șerban of Izvorani (as ispravnic)	Prince of Wallachia; September 1539 – early 1544	Succeeded by Stroe Florescu and Laiotă Basarab
Preceded by Stroe Florescu and Laiotă Basarab	Prince of Wallachia; 1544 – February 1545	Succeeded by Mircea the Shepherd
