= Cărpiniș (disambiguation) =

Cărpiniș may refer to several places in Romania:

- Cărpiniș, a commune in Timiș County
- Cărpiniș, a village in Gârbova Commune, Alba County
- Cărpiniș, a village in Roșia Montană Commune, Alba County
- Cărpiniș, a village in Tărlungeni Commune, Brașov County
- Cărpiniș, a village in Crasna Commune, Gorj County
- Cărpiniș, a village in Simeria town, Hunedoara County
- Cărpiniș, a village in Copalnic-Mănăștur Commune, Mureș County
- Cărpiniș, a former village in Băneasa Commune, Constanța County

== See also ==
- Cărpeniș, a village in Cepari Commune, Argeș County
- Cărpenișu, a village in Găiseni Commune, Giurgiu County
- Carpenul River (disambiguation)
