= Vladislav III of Wallachia =

Ruler of Wallachia (died 1525)

Vladislav III

Prince of Wallachia (1st reign)
- Reign: April – 8 November 1523
- Predecessor: Radu of Afumați
- Successor: Radu Bădica

Prince of Wallachia (2nd reign)
- Reign: June – September 1524
- Predecessor: Radu of Afumați
- Successor: Radu of Afumați

Prince of Wallachia (3rd reign)
- Reign: 19 April – August 1525
- Predecessor: Radu of Afumați
- Successor: Radu of Afumați
- Born: unknown
- Died: 1525
- Issue: Moise of Wallachia
- Religion: Orthodox

Vladislav III (? – 1525) was the nephew of Vladislav II of Wallachia and Voivode (Prince) of Wallachia from April 1523 until November of that same year. He regained the throne in June 1524, only to lose it again that September. He regained the throne a final time in April 1525 and ruled until August of the same year.

Vladislav III of Wallachia House of Drăculești
Regnal titles
Preceded by Radu of Afumați	Voivode of Wallachia; 1523	Succeeded by Radu Bădica
Preceded by Radu of Afumați	Voivode of Wallachia; 1524	Succeeded by Radu of Afumați
Preceded by Radu of Afumați	Voivode of Wallachia; 1525	Succeeded by Radu of Afumați
