= Carpenul River =

Carpenul River may refer to:

- Carpen, a tributary of the Cașin in Harghita County
- Carpenul, a tributary of the Teleajen in Prahova County

== See also ==
- Cărpiniș (disambiguation)
