= Filip Moldoveanul =

Romanian printer

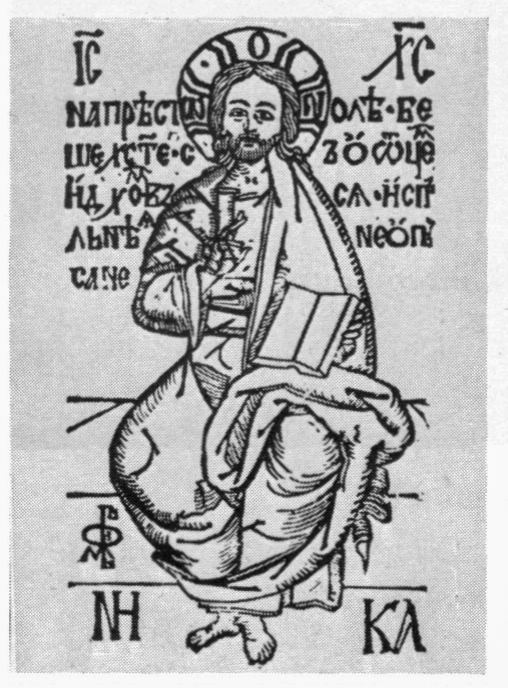
Monogram of Filip Moldoveanul from 1546

Filip Moldoveanul (Philip the Moldavian) printed in the Transylvanian city of Sibiu the so-called Catehismul Lutheran (the Lutheran Catechism) in 1544, the first book printed in the Romanian language.

In 1550, he also printed the first Slavonic-Romanian Tetravanghel (The Four Gospels), also in Sibiu.

== Career ==
Filip Moldoveanul was also known as Philip the Painter and was mentioned in 1521 as having been a liaison from the Sibiu Chancellery to the Romanian Countries. He was also noted as an envoy on missions sent to Radu Paisie, prince of Wallachia, from 1537 to 1539.
