= Radu of Afumați =

- Voivode of Wallachia
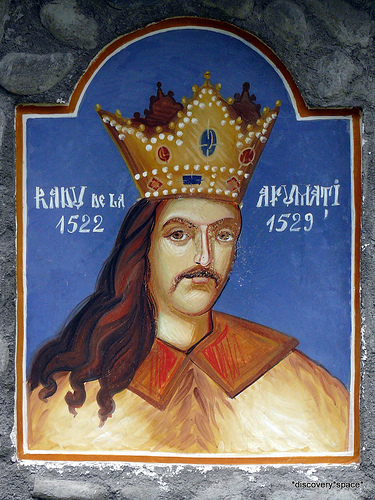

Voivode of Wallachia (1st reign)
- Reign: December 1522 – April 1523
- Predecessor: Teodosie of Wallachia
- Successor: Vladislav III of Wallachia

Voivode of Wallachia (2nd reign)
- Reign: January – June 1524
- Predecessor: Radu VI Bădica
- Successor: Vladislav III of Wallachia

Voivode of Wallachia (3rd reign)
- Reign: September 1524 – April 1525
- Predecessor: Vladislav III of Wallachia
- Successor: Vladislav III of Wallachia

Voivode of Wallachia (4th reign)
- Reign: August 1525 – 2 January 1529
- Predecessor: Vladislav III of Wallachia
- Successor: Basarab VI
- Died: 2 January 1529; Church of Cetățuia, Râmnicu Vâlcea, Principality of Wallachia
- Burial: Curtea de Argeș Cathedral
- Spouse: Doamna Voica of Bucsani; Doamna Ruxandra of Wallachia
- Issue: Vlad; Radu VIII Ilie Haidăul; Ana of Wallachia; Neacșa of Wallachia
- House: House of Drăculești
- Father: Radu IV the Great
- Mother: Doamna Catalina Crnojević of Zeta
- Religion: Eastern Orthodox Church

Radu of Afumați (1500? – 2 January 1529) was Voivode (Prince) of Wallachia between January 1522 and January 1529 (with intermittences in the first year, because he lost the throne between April–June and August–October 1522). He began his reign with a victory against Mehmed-Bey, a pretender to Wallachia's throne. From 1522 to 1525 he battled the Turks, who supported Vladislav III and Radu Bădica, both claimants of the throne. The inscription on his tombstone lists 20 battles. He was killed by decapitation on 2 January 1529 near Râmnicu Vâlcea, at Cetățuia Church. He was later buried in the Curtea de Argeș Cathedral.

== Name ==
He got the nickname "of Afumați" because he had a property in Afumați, Ilfov County, inherited from his grandfather Vlad the Monk (1482–1495). To distinguish him from other Wallachian rulers named Radu (especially his father and brothers), the Prince also received other nicknames. During his life he was referred to as Radu Vodă the Younger, and after his death he was also called Radu the Brave (in a document from 4 June 1588) as a recognition of his merits in stopping the Ottoman advance and preventing the transformation of Wallachia into a Turkish pashaluk. After the place where he was killed, he was also remembered as Prince Radu of Ramnic

== Family background ==
Radu of Afumați belonged to the House of Drăculești lineage, as son of the Wallachian Prince Radu IV the Great and of Princess Catalina. He had two sisters, Cristina and Boba.

His first wife, Voica, was the daughter of the vornic Vlaicu from Bucșani. She died in 1525. From this marriage the Prince had three children: Vlad (killed along with his father in 1529), Anca (married with the boyar Udriște from Mărgineni) and Neacșa.

On 21 January 1526, Radu married Princess Ruxandra, the daughter of Neagoe Basarab. They did have a son together, Radu Ilie Haidăul. After the death of Radu of Afumați, Ruxandra became the wife of another prince of Wallachia, Radu Paisie.

Among his half-brothers, three ascended the throne: Radu Bădica (1523–1524), Radu Paisie (1535–1545, with interruptions) and Mircea the Shepherd (1545–1552, 1553–1554, 1558–1559).

== Reign ==
Radu of Afumați became voivode of Wallachia despite the fact that the Ottoman sultan had supported Mehmed-Bey, the Pasha of Nikopol - a Romanian renegade converted to Islam, for the crown.

Radu defeated the army of Mehmed-Bey at Glubavi in January 1522. He took the throne and his first voivode charter was emitted in February 1522 at Târgoviște at was of the confirmation of the ownership of the Romanian Orthodox church over the Drăgotești estate. He styled himself the Lord of the whole country of Ungro-Wallachia.

The fight to defend his country's independence continued in the next months, when new victories were recorded at Ștefeni on Neajlov River (on Bucharest–Giurgiu Road), Clejani (both in February) and also at Ciocănești and Snagov (in March 1522)

In April 1522, Radu was forced to flee to Transylvania, where he had received the estates Vurpăr and Vințu de Jos from King Louis II of Hungary as a reward for fighting the Ottomans.

He crossed back the Carpathians in June and, with armed support from the Transylvanian Voivode John Zápolya, reconquered the Wallachian throne. He restored the Romanian administration and, after the battle of Grumazi, expelled the Turks from the country.

Mehmed Bey attacked again in the summer of 1522 with fresh forces. Despite victories at Gherghița, Bucharest and Slatina, Radu's army was weakened. After the Turks received reinforcements, he had to take refuge for the second time. Thus, on 15 August 1522, when Radu of Afumați entered Transylvania, Mehmed-Bey took the power. Trying to establish his authority, he introduced a regime of absolute terror, that lasted until the autumn of 1522. In October the two armies clashed at Rucăr and Radu obtained a new victory due to a better organization and tactic.

A new conflict started in the spring of 1524, when Vladislav III, from the House of Dănești claimed the throne.

In the summer of 1526 the Mohács disaster occurred and the Kingdom of Hungary collapsed, and its central part was occupied by the Ottoman Empire. The Romanian principalities (Wallachia and Moldavia) were now virtually surrounded by the Turks.

== Death ==
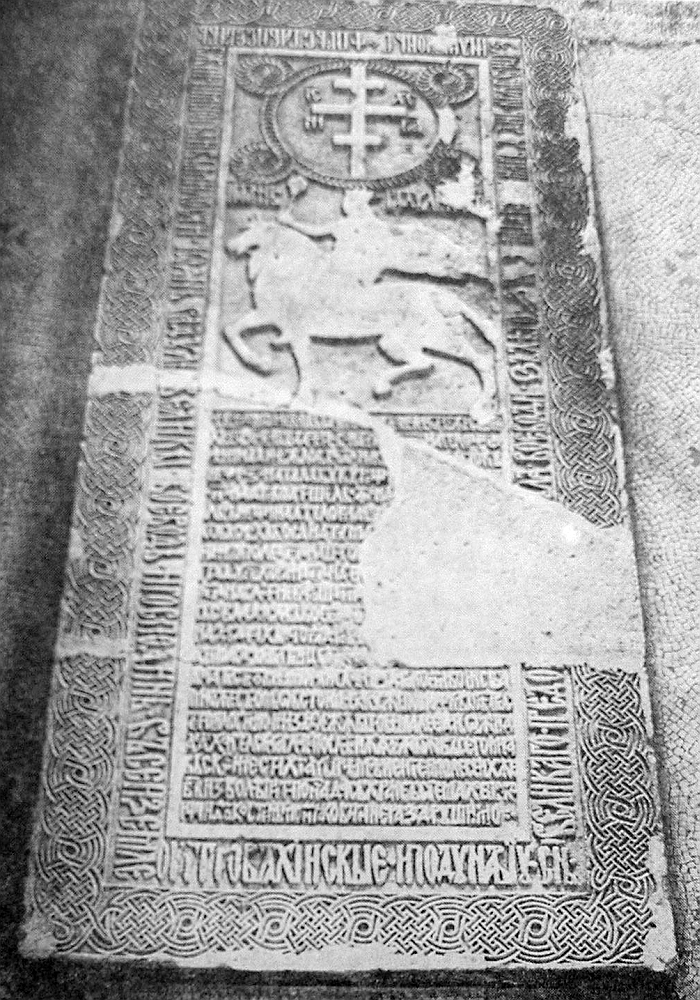
Tombstone of Radu of Afumați, listing the places of all of his battles

At the end of 1528, a group of noblemen led by Neagoe and Drăgan rose against Radu, who fled west, seeking refuge under the protection of the Craiovești family. He was caught near Râmnicu Vâlcea and killed in the church of Cetățuia, together with his son Vlad on 2 January 1529. The two heads were sent to the Ottoman Sultan's court in Constantinople, whilst the Prince's body was buried on 4 January at Curtea de Argeș Cathedral. He was around 35–36 years, and had reigned seven years.

Radu of Afumați House of Drăculești Died: 1529
Regnal titles
Preceded by Teodosie	Voivode of Wallachia; 1522–1523	Succeeded by Vladislav III
Preceded by Radu al VI-lea Bădica	Voivode of Wallachia; 1524	Succeeded by Vladislav III
Preceded by Vladislav IIIa	Voivode of Wallachia; 1524–1525	Succeeded by Vladislav III
Preceded by Vladislav III	Voivode of Wallachia; 1525–1529	Succeeded by Basarab VI
