= Ruxandra Basarab =

Romanian princess

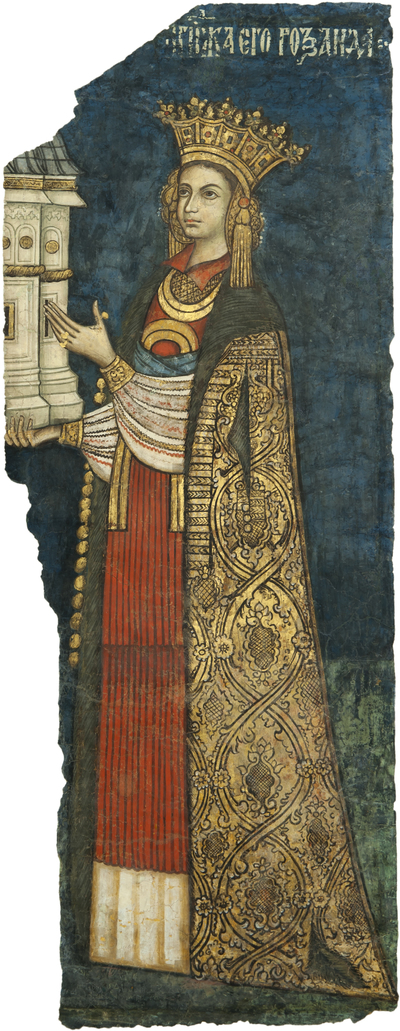
- Portrait of Lady Roxanda
- Born: 16th century
- Died: 1545
- Spouse: Radu of Afumați (d. 1529); Radu Paisie (m. 1541)
- Father: Neagoe Basarab
- Mother: Milica Despina

Ruxandra Basarab (died 1545) was a Romanian princess. She was the daughter of Neagoe Basarab (a prince of Wallachia) and Milica Despina of Wallachia, and became princess consort of Wallachia by her marriage to Radu Paisie.

Ruxandra's first marriage was to Radu of Afumați, Voivode of Wallachia. After his death, she married again, to Radu Paisie, Prince of Wallachia, in 1541.

Before ascending the throne in 1535, Radu Paisie had been a monk, and was once abbott of the Arges monastery.
