= Portrait of Lady Roxanda =

Painting by Dobromir

- Doamna Roxanda (Romanian)
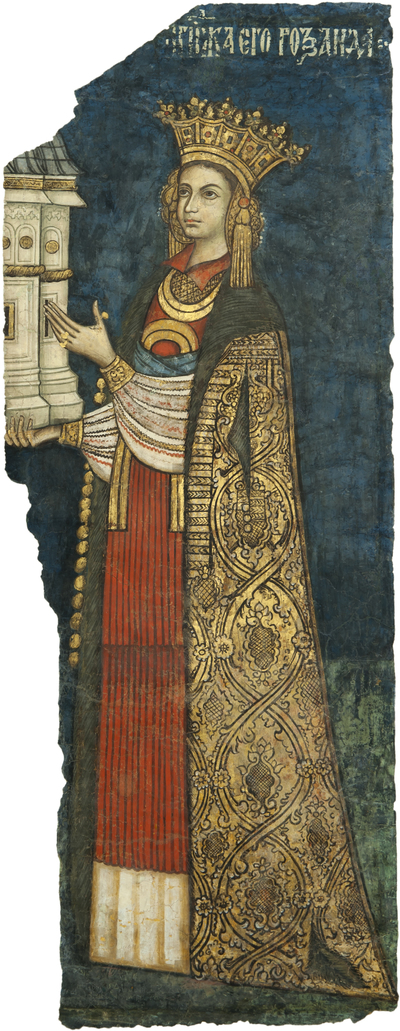
- Artist: Dobromir
- Year: 1526
- Type: fresco
- Dimensions: 223 cm × 87.9 cm (88 in × 34.6 in)
- Location: National Museum of Art of Romania, Bucharest

Portrait of Lady Roxanda (Romanian: Doamna Roxanda) is a painting by Dobromir. Dobromir and his students finished the painting for the Curtea de Argeș Cathedral, in about 1526.

== Description ==
The picture measures 223 x 87.9 centimeters. The mural is stored the National Museum of Art of Romania, in Bucharest.

In 1882, French restorers decided to dismantle the original work into 35 fragments - about 1/10 from the original amount: 29 are in the National Museum of Art of Romania, and National Museum of Romanian History, 4 belong to churches.

== Analysis ==
Lady Roxandra was a princess, the youngest daughter of Neagoe Basarab, who was the ruler of Wallachia between 1512 and 1521, and his consort Milica Despina. Roxandra is shown standing, holding a model of the monastery of Curtea de Arges, Wallachia's main church of the 16th century, the tomb of Romania's kings. On her head is a large crown.
