= Teodosie of Wallachia =

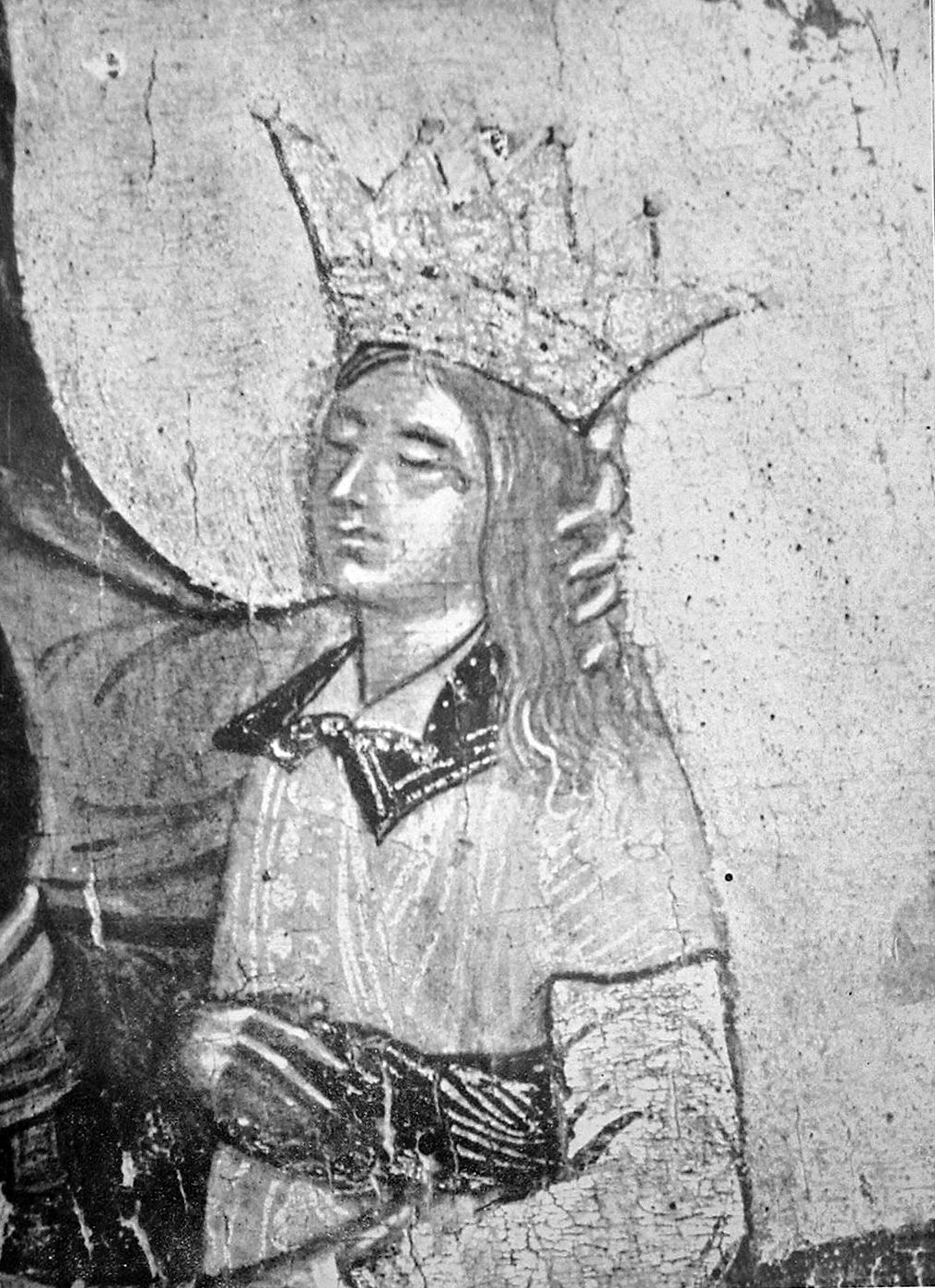

Voivode of Wallachia with Doamna Milica Despina of Serbia
- Reign: 15 September – December 1521
- Predecessor: Neagoe Basarab
- Successor: Radu of Afumați
- Died: 25 January 1522; Istanbul, Ottoman Empire
- House: House of Craiovești
- Father: Neagoe Basarab of Wallachia
- Mother: Milica Despina of Serbia
- Religion: Eastern Orthodox Church

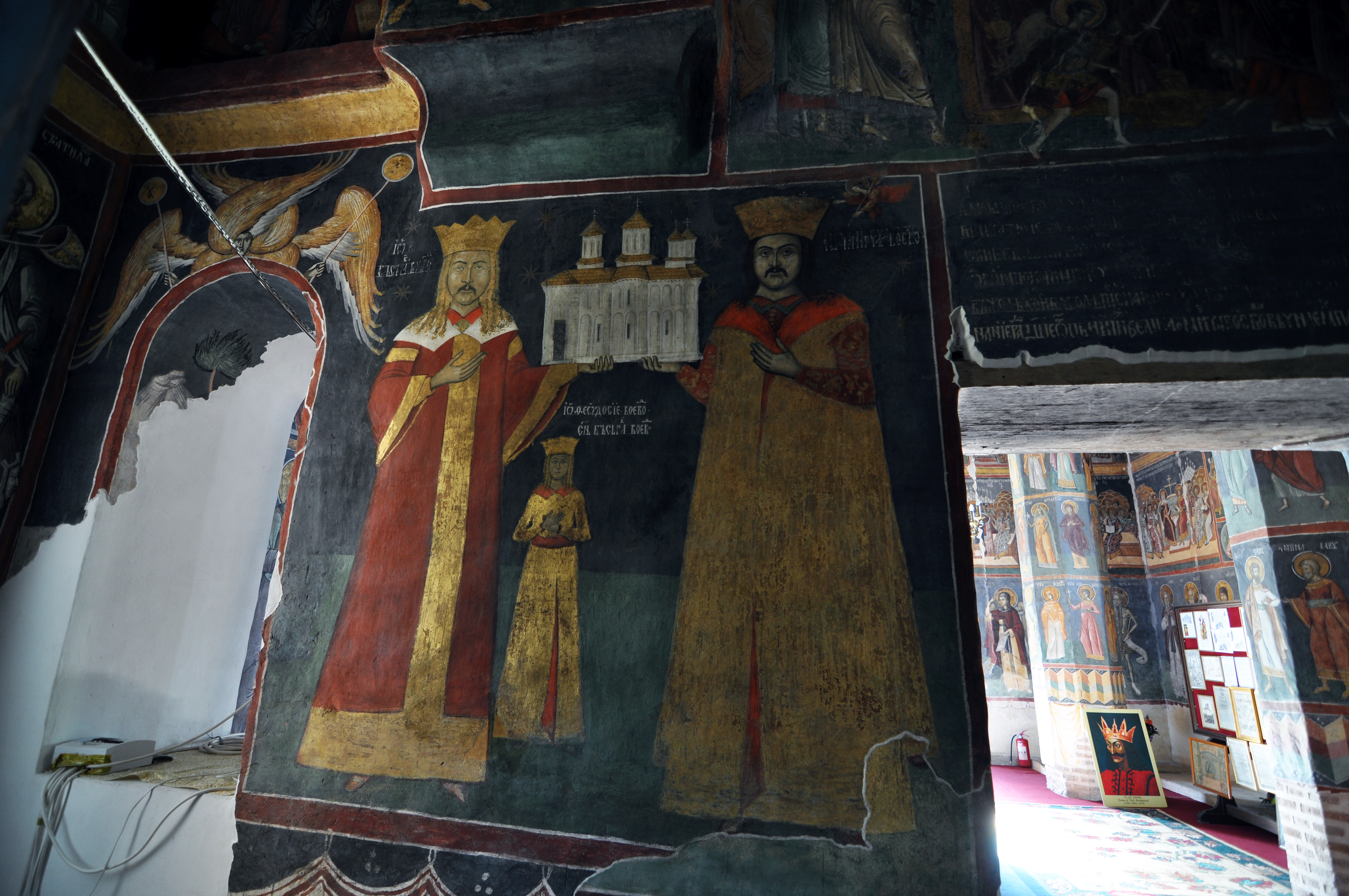
On the left, Neagoe Basarab with his son Teodosie

Teodosie (died 25 January 1522), was the Voivode (Prince) of Wallachia, a historical and geographical region in present-day Romania, between 1521 and 1522. He was the son and heir of Neagoe Basarab. Being too young to be the ruler, his regents were his mother, Serbian princess Milica Despina and his uncle, Preda Craiovescu of the Craiovești family. In the battle between the Draculești and the prince's army (10 October 1521), Preda Craiovescu died. As a result, Teodosie fled to Oltenia with his mother before seeking refuge in Istanbul.

== Sources ==
- Academia Romana (2012). A History of Romanians. Vol. IV (2nd ed.). Bucuresti: Editura Enciclopedica. ISBN 978-973-45065-2-1.

Teodosie Craiovești Died: 1522
Regnal titles
| Preceded by Neagoe Basarab V | Voivode of Wallachia; 1521–1522 | Succeeded by Radu V |
Notes and references
1. Regnal Chronologies
