= Grigore H. Grandea =

Wallachian, poet, and prose writer

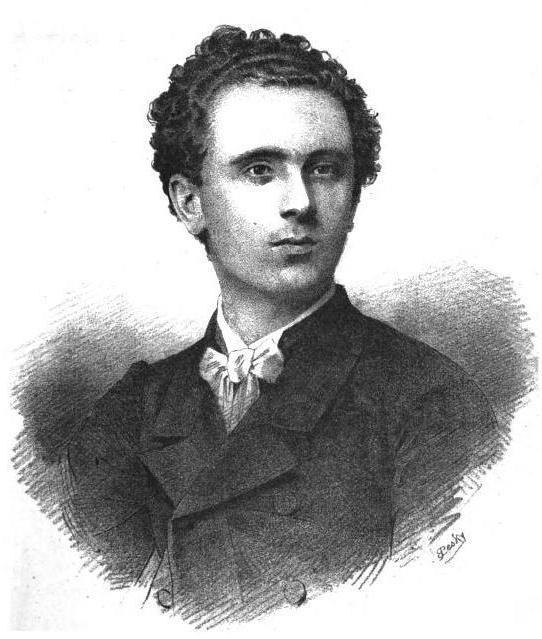
Gr. H. Grandea - Portret01

Grigore Haralamb Grandea (October 26, 1843–November 8, 1897) was a Wallachian, later Romanian journalist, poet and prose writer.

Born in Țăndărei, Ialomița County, his parents were Haralambie Georgiu (Grandea), a merchant of Aromanian origin, and his wife Maria (née Baldovin). He studied at the national school of medicine and pharmacy (1855-1859) and, intermittently, at Saint Sava High School in the national capital Bucharest, graduating in 1865. In 1866 and 1867, he took courses at the philosophy and literature faculty of the University of Liège, but did not graduate. He worked as an intern at Colțea Hospital (1860), a surgeon's assistant in Ilfov County (1861), a battalion's medic in Bucharest, a professor of natural sciences at the national school of medicine and pharmacy (1862-1863), secretary of the State Archives' document committee (1864), school inspector for Gorj and Mehedinți counties (1871) and interim professor at Bucharest (1868), Craiova (1874) and Bacău (1888). All these jobs were temporary, and for significant periods of time, he supported himself through journalism, working as an editor at Monitorul Oficial, Dâmbovița, Presa, Timpul and Războiul. A passionate and fairly talented newspaperman, he was chief editor for a number of periodicals, including Albina Pindului (1868-1878), Liceul român (1870), Steaua Daciei (1871), Tribuna (1873), Bucegiu (1879) and Sentinela (1887). He wrote for many of the country's major magazines and newspapers, including Foaie pentru minte, inimă și literatură, Amicul poporului, Familia, Trompeta Carpailor, Românul, Columna lui Traian and Universul literar. His anti-liberal political orientation presaged that of Mihai Eminescu. During the 1860s and 1870s, he advocated for republicanism and was an adversary of domnitor (later king) Carol I.

He made his verse debut in 1859, in the "political and literary broadsheet" Dâmbovița, which he edited. As a poet, he was a tumultuous and pathos-filled romantic, more of a versifier, and only a few fragments of his writings endured beyond his age. His poetry books are Preludele (1862), Poezii. Miosotis (1865), Poezii nouă (1873) and Nostalgia. Poezii (1885). His two novels, rather more interesting, are Fulga sau ideal și real (1872) and Vlăsia sau ciocoii noi (1887). He wrote a number of short stories in which he showed inventiveness in creating intrigue, ability as a narrator and a certain talent in sketching comic portraits, genre scenes and picturesque and romantic characters. He translated and reworked numerous poetic and prose works; some of them were included in his own books but most remained in newspapers alone. The authors involved include Theocritus, Virgil, Sappho, Anacreon, Seneca the Younger, Ovid, Lucian, Hafez, Dante Alighieri, William Shakespeare, Ludwig Uhland, James Macpherson (Ossian), Alexander Pushkin, Thomas Gray, Sully Prudhomme, Jules Verne, Émile Zola, George Sand and Adam Mickiewicz. Grandea died in Bacău.
