= Vlad Vintilă de la Slatina =

- Voivode of Wallachia
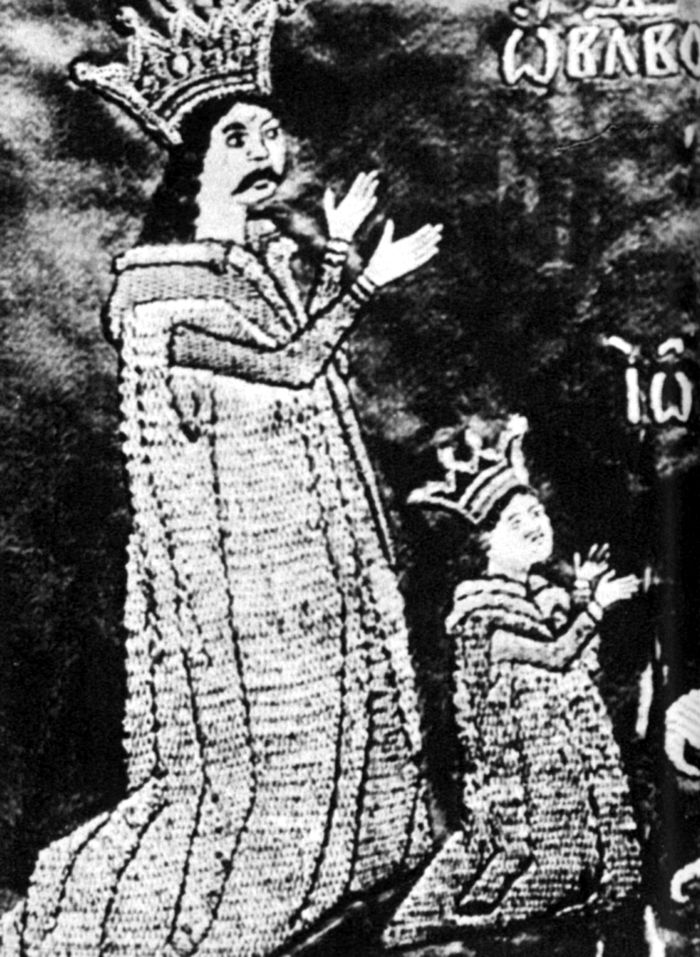
- Painting of Vlad and his son Radu

Voivode of Wallachia
- Reign: 18 September 1532 – 10 June 1535
- Predecessor: Vlad VI Înecatul
- Successor: Radu Paisie
- Born: unknown
- Died: 4 June 1535
- Wives: Zamfira; Rada
- Issue: 2
- House: Drăculeşti
- Dynasty: Basarab
- Father: Radu cel Mare

Vlad VII Vintilă de la Slatina (died 1535) was a Wallachian nobleman who reigned as the principality's voivode from 1532 to 1535. He was assassinated during a hunting expedition near Craiova.

Vlad V cel Tânăr House of Basarab; Drăculești branch Died: 1535
Regnal titles
Preceded by Moise	Voivode of Wallachia; 1532–1535	Succeeded by Radu VII Paisie
