= Milica Despina of Wallachia =

Princess of Wallachia

Milica Despina of Serbia
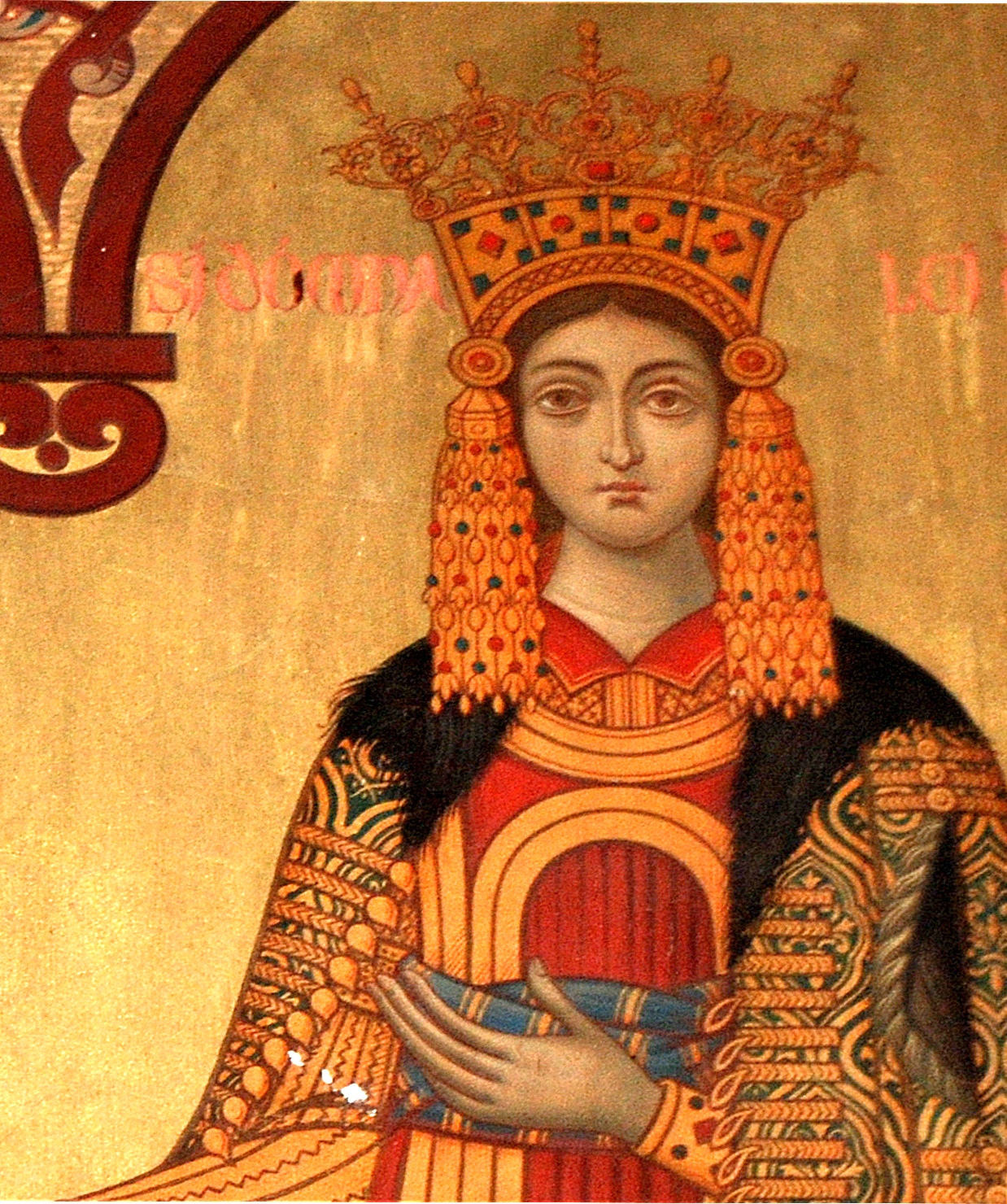

Regent of Wallachia
- Regency: 1521–1522
- Voivode: Teodosie of Wallachia

Princess Consort of Wallachia
- Tenure: 1512–1521
- Born: c.1485
- Died: 30 January 1554 (aged 68–69); Sibiu, Transylvania
- Spouse: Neagoe Basarab of Wallachia
- Issue: Teodosie of Wallachia; Ioan; Petru; Stana of Wallachia; Angelina of Wallachia; Ruxandra of Wallachia
- House: House of Branković (by birth); House of Craiovești (by marriage)
- Father: Jovan Branković, Despot of Serbia or Đorđe Branković, Despot of Serbia
- Mother: Jelena Jakšić

Milica Despina (Serbian Cyrillic: Милица Деспина; Romanian: Milița Despina; c. 1485 – 30 January 1554) was the Princess consort of Wallachia by marriage to Neagoe Basarab (r. 1512–1521). She was regent of Wallachia from 1521 to 1522, on the behalf of her son Teodosie of Wallachia. In later years, she became a nun, and took the name Platonida.

== Life ==
Princess Milica Despina was of Serbian origin, and closely related to noble houses of Branković and Lazarević. In historiography, there are several theories about her parents. Some scholars think that she was one of the daughters of Serbian despot Jovan Branković who died in 1502. Others think that she was daughter of Jovan's elder brother, Serbian despot Đorđe Branković who died in 1516. Some hold other views about her origins.

== Issue ==
Milica Despina and Neagoe Basarab had six children:

- Teodosie of Wallachia
- Stana of Wallachia married to Stephen IV of Moldavia
- Petru
- Ioan
- Ruxandra of Wallachia married to Radu of Afumați, and later to Radu Paisie
- Angelina (Anghelina) of Wallachia

== Literature ==
- I. C. Filitti, "Despina, princesse de Valachie, fille présumée de Jean Brankovitch", Revista istorică română, I (3), București 1931, 241–250.
- I. R. Mircea, P. Ş. Năsturel, "De l'ascendance de Despina, épouse du voévode Neagoe Basarab", Romanoslavica, X, București 1964, 435–437.
- C. Nicolescu, "Princesses Serbes sur le trône des Principautes Roumanies", Зборник за ликовне уметности, 5, Нови Сад 1969, 95–117.
