= Radu Bădica =

- Voivode of Wallachia

Voivode of Wallachia
- Reign: November 1523 – January 1524
- Predecessor: Vladislav III
- Successor: Radu of Afumați
- Died: January 19, 1524
- Burial: Dealu Monastery, Viforâta
- House: House of Drăculeşti (branch of the House of Basarab)
- Father: Radu IV the Great

Radu Bădica (? – 19 January 1524) was the son of Radu IV the Great and Prince of Wallachia from November 1523 until January 1524.

Radu Bădica House of Drăculești Died: 1524
Regnal titles
Preceded by Vladislav III	Voivode of Wallachia; 1523 – 1524	Succeeded by Radu of Afumați
