= Radu IV the Great =

- Voivode of Wallachia
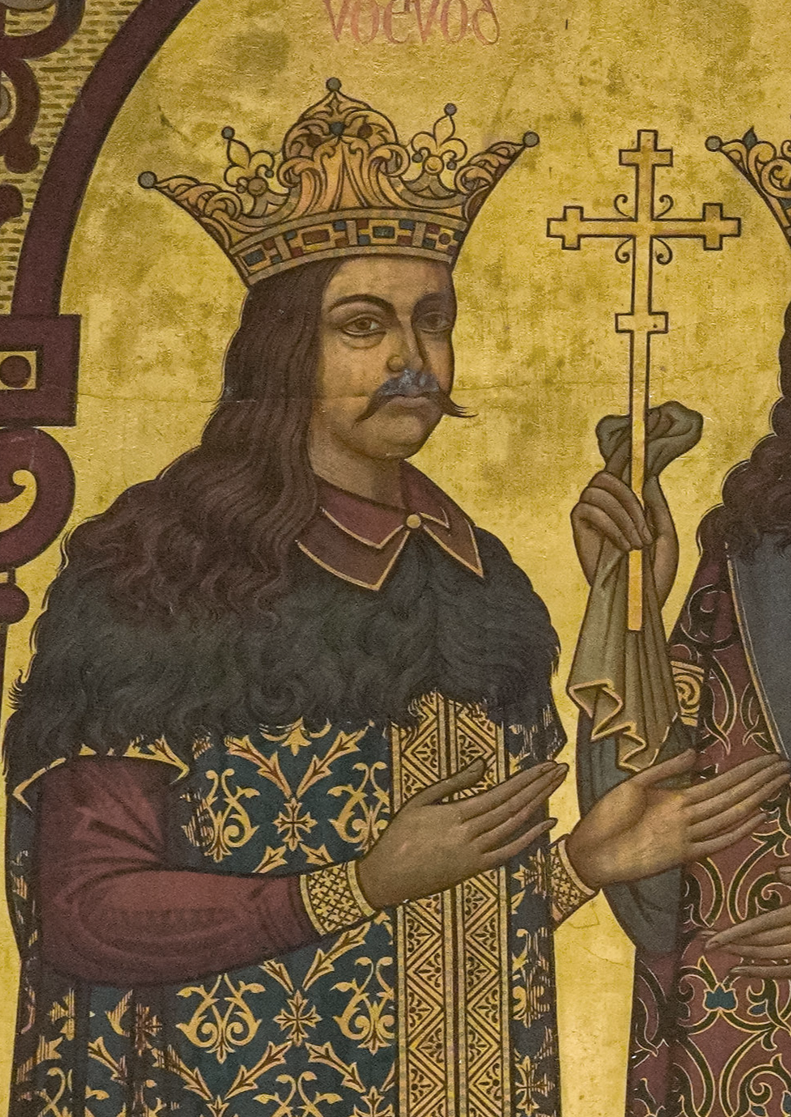
- Radu IV the Great fresco at Curtea de Arges

Voivode of Wallachia
- Reign: 15 September 1495 – 23 April 1508
- Predecessor: Vlad IV Călugărul
- Successor: Mihnea cel Rău
- Born: 1467
- Died: 23 April 1508 (aged 40–41)
- Spouse: Catalina Crnojević of Zeta
- Issue: Radu V of Afumați; Radu VI Bădica; Radu VII Paisie; Mircea V the Shepherd; Vlad Vintilă de la Slatina; Cărstina of Wallachia; Ana of Wallachia; Boba of Wallachia
- House: House of Drăculești
- Father: Vlad IV Călugărul
- Mother: Doamna Rada Smaranda
- Religion: Eastern Orthodox Church

Radu IV the Great (Romanian: Radu cel Mare; 1467 – 23 April 1508) was a Voivode (Prince) of Wallachia from September 1495 to April 1508.

== Biography ==
He succeeded his father, Vlad Călugărul, who was one of the three brothers to Vlad III the Impaler (Romanian: Vlad Țepeș). He was married to Princess Catalina Crnojević of Zeta (sometimes spelled as Katarina or Jekaterina), member of the House of Crnojević, the daughter of Ivan Crnojević and his wife Voisava Arianiti. Radu was succeeded by his first cousin Mihnea cel Rău, son to his uncle Vlad Țepeș.

== Reign ==
Radu the Great, the son of Vlad the Monk, received a select education and was designated heir to the throne since his father's time. Ascending the throne in 1495, he was mature, married to Lady Catalina and had several children. His reign was a peaceful one, focused on internal organization, supporting the Church and culture, without major wars. The exception was the conflict in 1506 with Bogdan III of Moldavia, generated by Radu's support for a pretender to the throne; the dispute ended with the mediation of Maxim Brancović, future metropolitan of Wallachia. During the time of Radu the Great, the boyars were trying to limit the princely authority through Ottoman support, which is why the voivode approached the Craiovești family, offering them privileges. In 1507, he brought to Târgoviște the Serbian hieromonk Macarie, who printed the first book on Romanian territory here – the Liturgy (1508), making Târgoviște an important printing center in southeastern Europe. At the same time, Radu fortified the city and erected large religious buildings: the Dealu Monastery and the new headquarters of the Metropolitanate, later completed by Neagoe Basarab.

== Introducing printing press to Wallachia ==
He is credited, along with Church officials, for introducing the printing press to Wallachia at the beginning of the 16th century. His wife's family first founded Crnojević printing house in which the first book in the Cyrillic script of Church Slavonic among South Slavs was printed back in 1494.

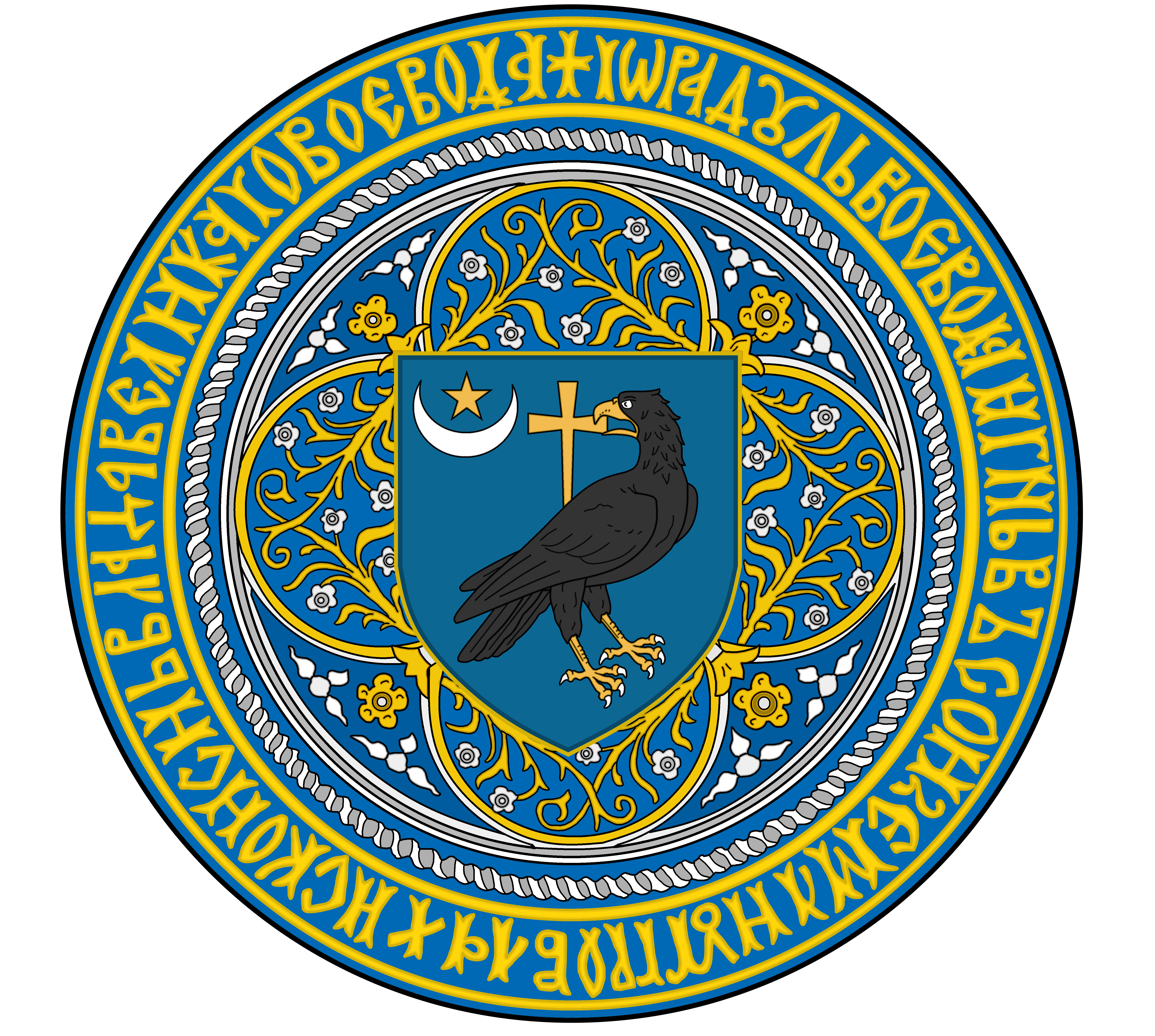
Seal of voivode and lord Radu IV the Great of Wallachia 1499, rebuilt and colored from scratch after the original from 1499

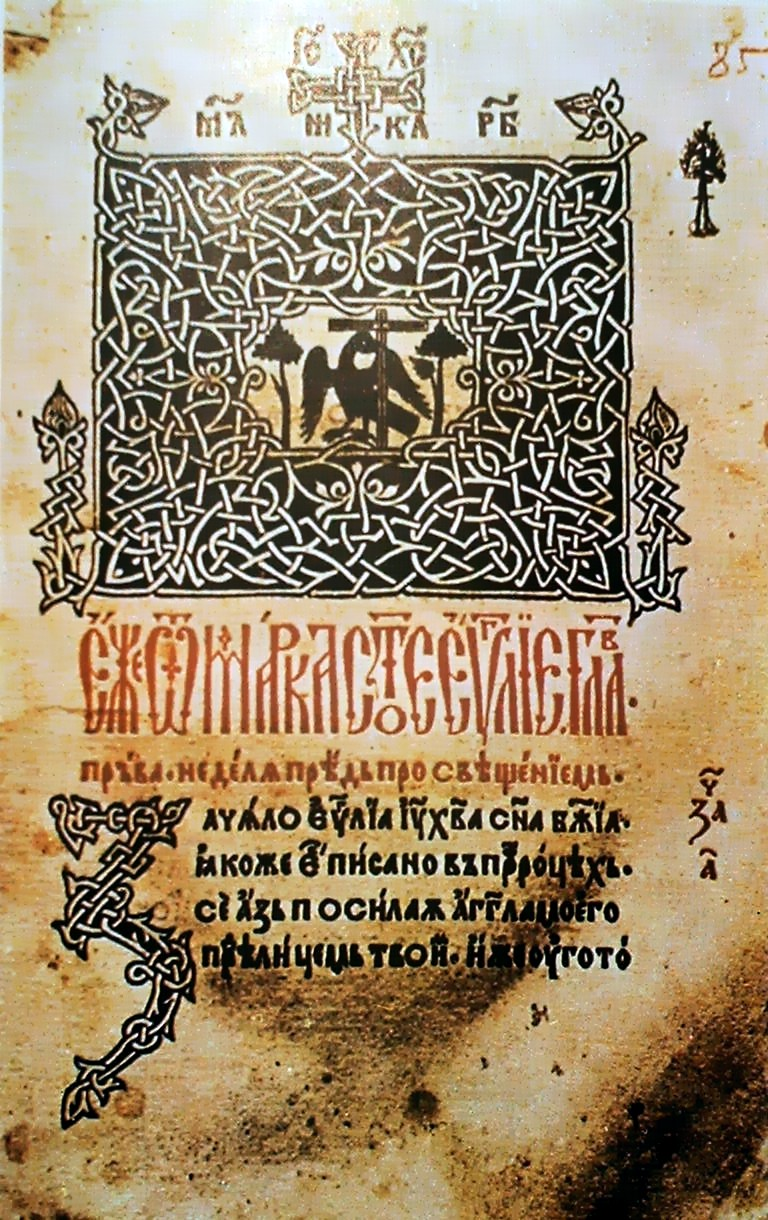
Serbian Orthodox monk Makarije's Monastic Liturgy, Târgoviște, 1508 (the first book printed in Wallachia), founder of Serbian and Romanian printing

== Radu the Great and Saint Nephon ==
Radu the Great met Nephon II of Constantinople, former patriarch of Constantinople, at the Sublime Porte and, impressed by his wisdom, summoned him to Wallachia, where in 1502 he appointed him Metropolitan of Târgoviște. Niphon reorganized church life, founding the Bishopric of Buzău and establishing three main dioceses.

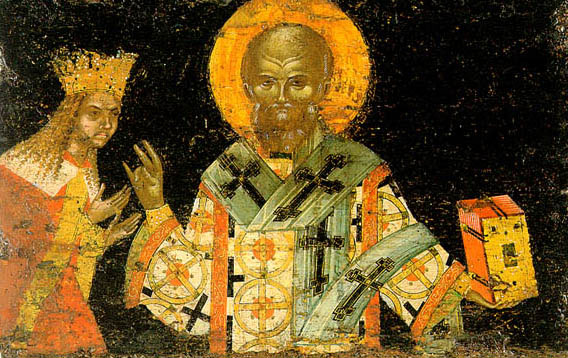
Fresco of Saint Nephon II of Constantinople with peripheral crowned figure from 16th-18th Century

Their relations deteriorated in 1504, when Niphon publicly condemned the illegitimate marriage of Lady Caplea (Radu's sister) to the boyar Bogdan. Reprimanded by the metropolitan, Radu forced him to leave the country. Nifon retired to Mount Athos, where he died in 1508.

In 1517, at the initiative of Neagoe Basarab, Nifon's relics were brought to Wallachia and placed on the tomb of Radu the Great, as a sign of forgiveness and release from the curse. Nifon's canonization also took place at that time.

== End of his rule ==
Radu the Great, who suffered from gout and other illnesses, died unexpectedly in 1508 before securing the throne for his sons. His death left behind a rich, well-organized country, with prestige among his neighbors, a vulnerable state to interference from the Ottomans and Hungarians, amid rival claims to the throne. He was buried in his own foundation, Dealu Monastery, in a stone tomb he had prepared. Gavril Protul notes that the lord "was buried in the grave he had made in the besearic's tent", and the chronicler Radu Popescu added "[the grave] he had prepared for himself, carved in stone as you can see". In 1908, on the 400th anniversary of his death, his remains were placed in a marble sarcophagus sculpted by Carol Storck, funded by the Romanian state.

== Legacy ==
Radu the Great main foundation was Dealu Monastery, a major medieval religious and architectural monument, which also became an important princely necropolis, housing his tomb and those of five other Wallachian rulers. He also supported monasteries such as Govora, Tismana, and Glavacioc in Wallachia, and several monasteries on Mount Athos (Cutlumuș, Zografu, Hilandar, Sf. Pantelimon, Dochiariu). Less known is his contribution to building churches for the Vlachs in the Timok Valley (today in Bulgaria and Serbia).

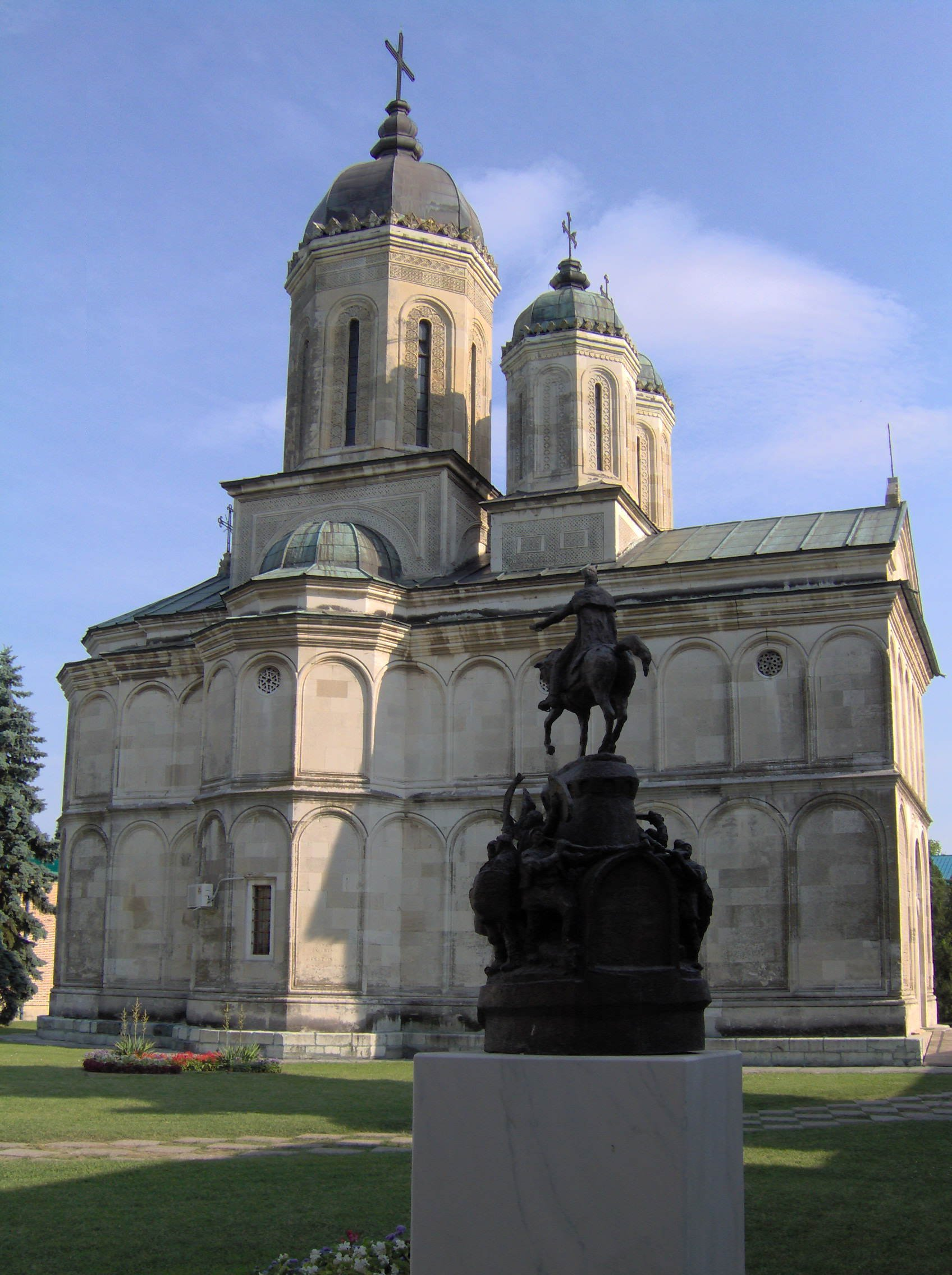
Dealu Monastery

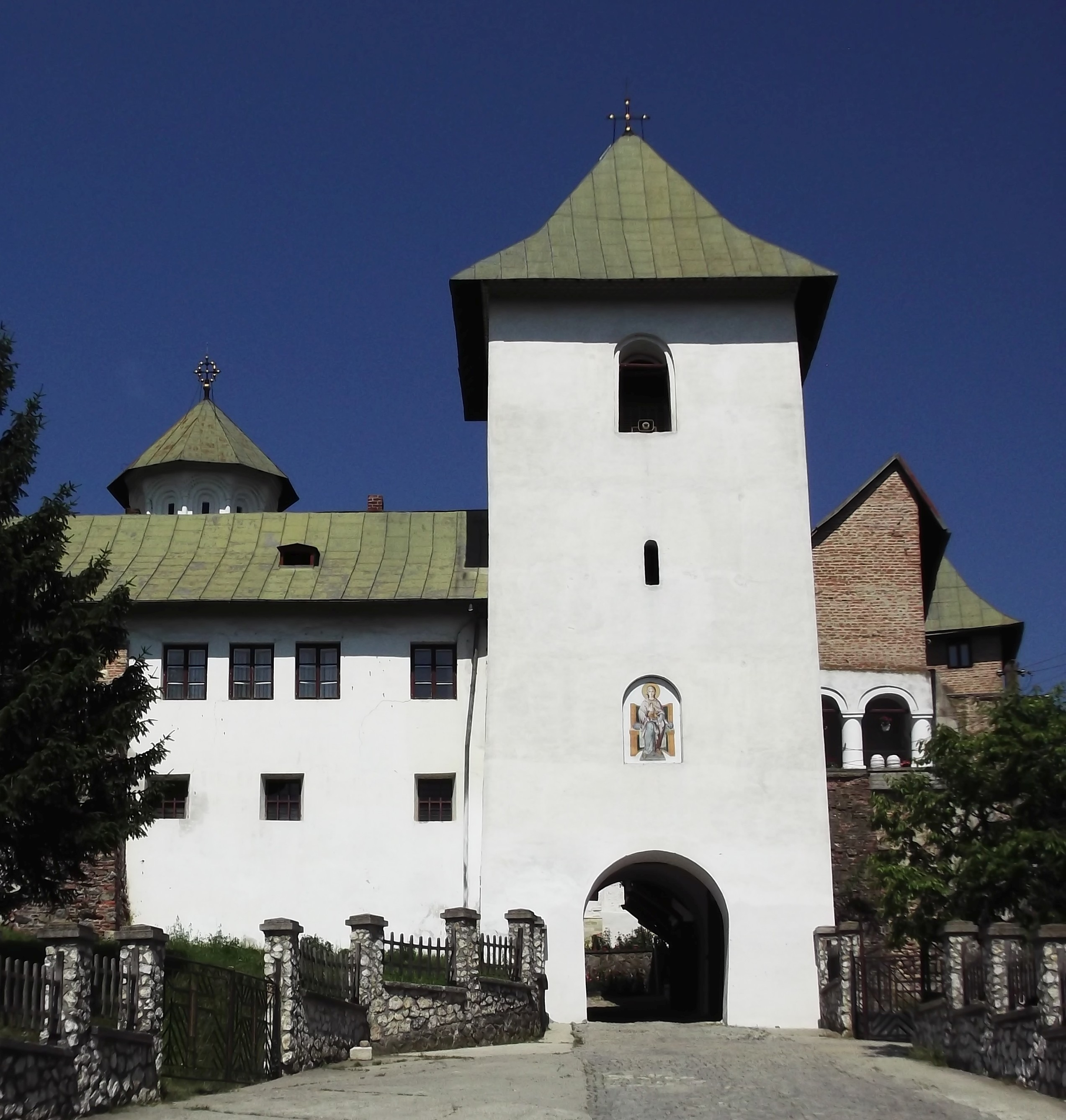
Govora Monastery

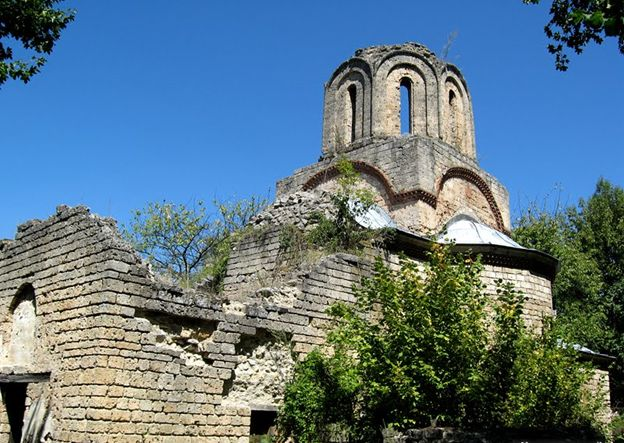
Lăpuşnea Monastery in Timok Valley

== Notes and references ==
Radu IV the Great House of Drăculești Born: 1462 Died: 1508
Regnal titles
Preceded by Vlad Călugărul	Voivode of Wallachia; 1495–1508	Succeeded by Mihnea cel Rău
