= Găiseni =

- Commune
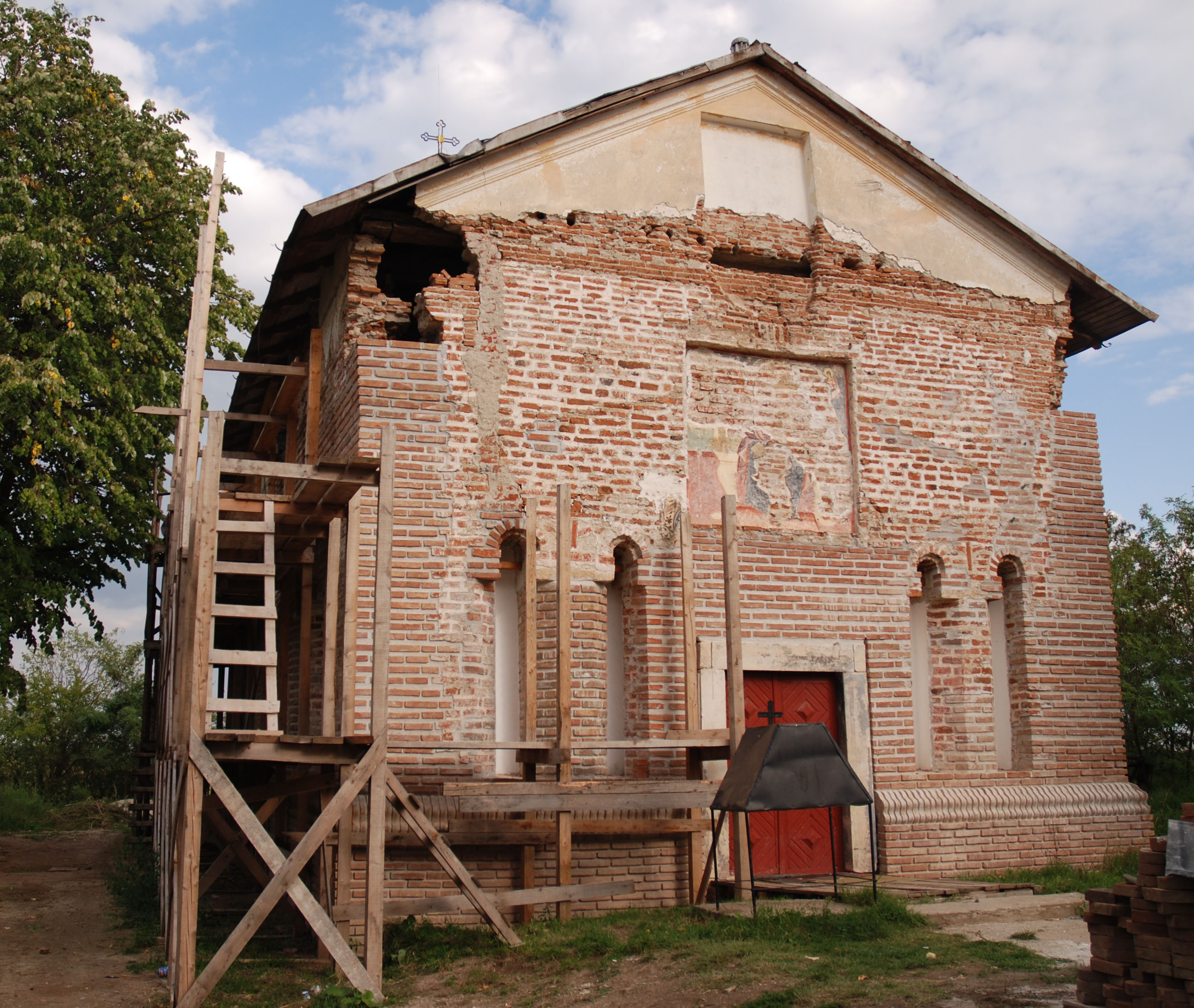
- Strâmbu-Găiseni Monastery in Găiseni village

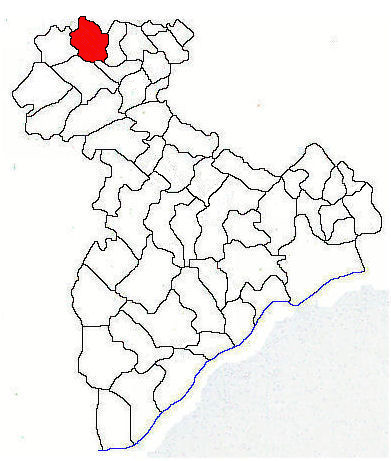
- Location in Giurgiu County

- Location in Romania
- Coordinates: 44°31′N 25°39′E
- Country: Romania
- County: Giurgiu

Government
  - Mayor (2024–2028): Gheorghe Manea (PNL)
- Area: 25.43 km^{2} (9.82 sq mi)
- Elevation: 125 m (410 ft)
- Population (2021-12-01): 5,131
  - Density: 201.8/km^{2} (522.6/sq mi)
- Time zone: UTC+02:00 (EET)
  - Summer (DST): UTC+03:00 (EEST)
- Postal code: 87085
- Area code: +(40) 246
- Vehicle reg.: GR
- Website: comunagaiseni.ro

Găiseni is a commune located in Giurgiu County, Muntenia, Romania. It is composed of four villages: Cărpenișu, Căscioarele, Găiseni, and Podu Popa Nae.

Historical population
Year	Pop.	±%
2002	5,541	—
2011	5,514	−0.5%
2021	5,131	−6.9%
Source: Census data
