= Fundeni, Bucharest =

Neighbourhood in Bucharest, Romania

Coordinates: 44.46074°N 26.163511°E

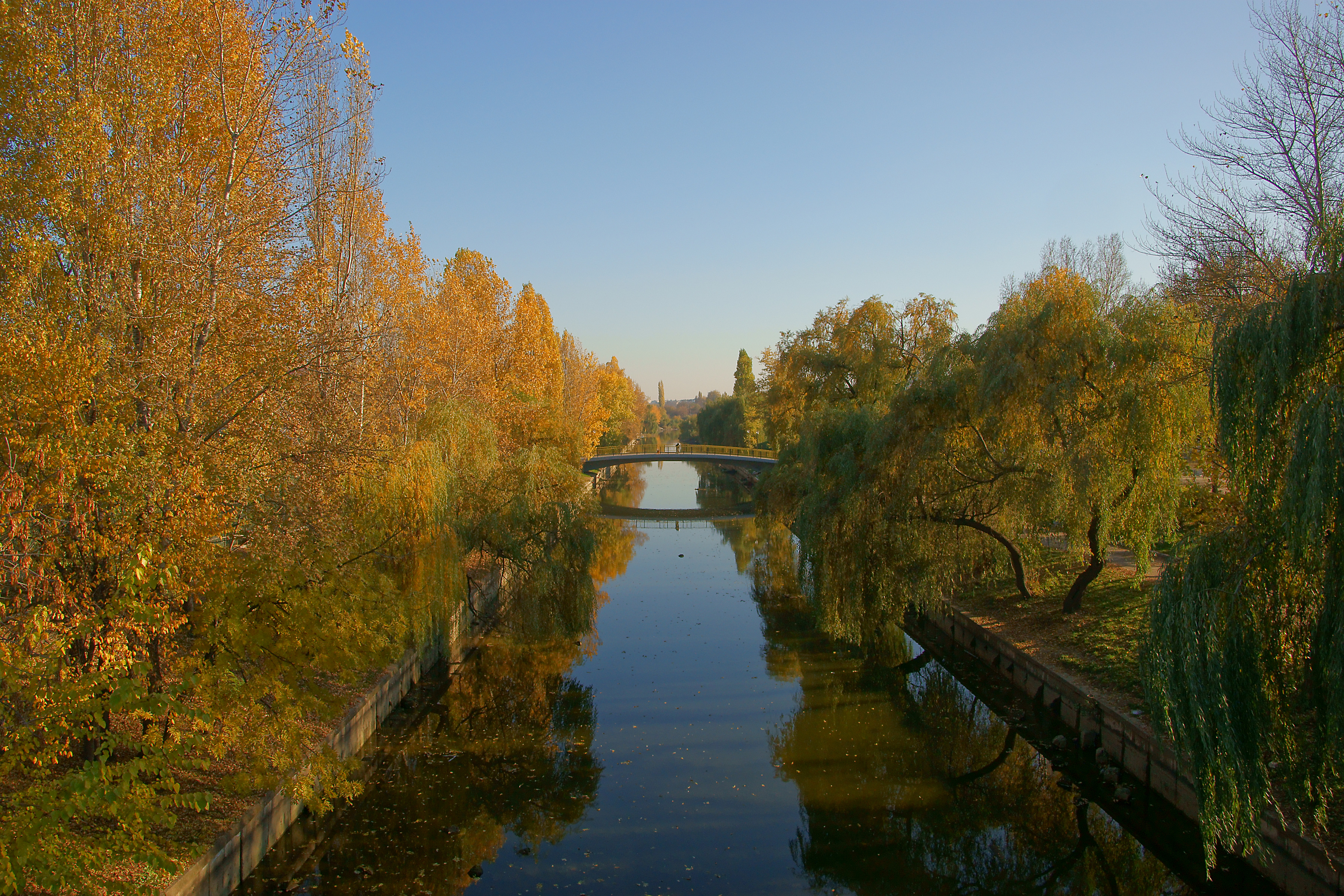
Colentina River

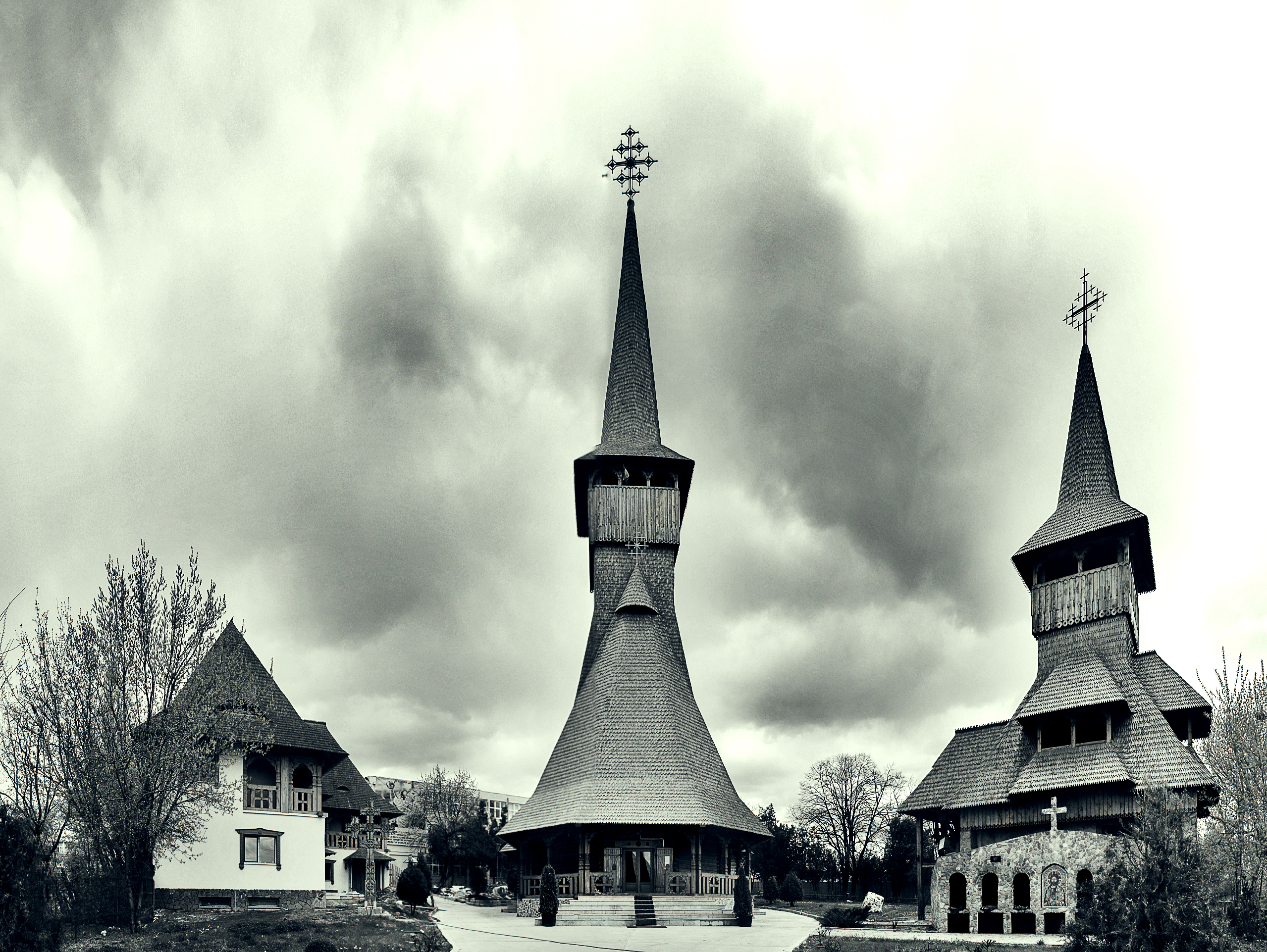
Trei Ierarhi church, Fundeni

Fundeni is a district in Sector 2 of Bucharest, Romania. It is situated in the northeastern outskirts of the city, on the left bank of the Colentina River, downstream of Plumbuita Monastery, and near the Fundeni Lake that was formed on the river. On its west and north-west are located the Colentina and Andronache neighbourhoods, on its north the town of Voluntari and on its east the commune of Dobroești.

== Etymology ==
Its name is derived from the Romanian word fund ("bottom") and the toponym refers to the people who came from or lived on the bottom of a valley.

== History ==
=== Medieval history ===
The village of Fundeni was built in a place isolated from Bucharest by the Colentina River and its lakes. Without a direct road towards Bucharest, the only way to reach the city was through the road that led to Afumați, Ilfov. Another crossing was found in the place where now the railway bridge between the Obor railway station and the Bucharest-Constanța railway. Fundeni was surrounded of forests, one of which, Grădiștea, is mentioned in a June 13, 1634 document which tells about the priest of the village who became a monk and built his own small church and hermitage in the middle of the forest.

The village was first mentioned in 1559, when Prince Mircea Ciobanul gave a deed of property to a certain Baldovin and his sister Neacșa, who inherited parts of the domain of Fundeni from their father and showed the prince some older documents which proved their ownership. From these documents, it is clear that the village was much older and that initially it was inhabited by free men. Throughout the 17th century, there are documents which prove that there were various landlords who owned parts of the Fundeni estate, being owned by Logofăt Stanciu, Spătar Miho, Clucer Tomeanul and Logofăt Vâlcul. Starting with the end of the 16th and 17th centuries, the land ownership is concentrated into just a few landlords.

In Fundeni, on 25 October/4 November 1632, Matei Basarab defeated the army Radu Ilieș, who also claimed the throne of Wallachia. In the second half of the 17th century, Spătar Mihai Cantacuzino came to own most of the Fundeni domain, receiving 500 stânjeni along the Colentina on the Bucharest side from Șerban Cantacuzino and Constantin Brâncoveanu, while gained further parts of the village through his marriage to Marga Mogoșeasca and through buyouts. Cantacuzino built new houses in the village and created the Fundeni lake on Colentina River.

=== Early modern era ===
In the 18th century, the village was divided into two parts: the Fundenii-Doamnei, owned by the Mogoșești family (northern side) and Fundenii-Racoviță, owned by the Racoviță family (southern side), as it was found on the 1791 Austrian map. Vel Vistier Dumitrașco Racoviță built around 1765-66 on his estate a paper mill, known as hardughia de pe apa Colintinii, using foreign technicians and the corvée work of the people living on the domain. Nevertheless, the village still remained with an agrarian economy and dominated by feudal forms of organization.

=== Late modern and contemporary ===
In 1864, the village, together with Colentina formed the Colentina-Fundeni rural commune. The 1864 land reform did distribute property to some peasants, without disbanding large properties. Towards the end of the 19th century, out of the 653 hectares of the arrable land administered by the village, 500 hectares were owned by the landlord Ștefan Capșa, while the rest 153 hectares were owned by the peasants. Total population of the village was 279.

In 1939, Fundeni was included in Bucharest, together with other villages in the area. After World War II, Colentina was rebuilt as an urban neighbourhood, but Fundeni remained more rural for decades after its inclusion in the city.

Institutul Clinic Fundeni, one of the largest hospitals in Romania, is located in Fundeni, being built in 1959.
