= Plumbuita =

Plumbuita may refer to:

- Plumbuita, a village in the Tămădău Mare Commune, Călărași County
- Plumbuita Monastery, in Colentina, Bucharest
