= Plumbuita Monastery =

Heritage site in Bucharest, Romania

Coordinates: 44°28′20″N 26°08′07″E

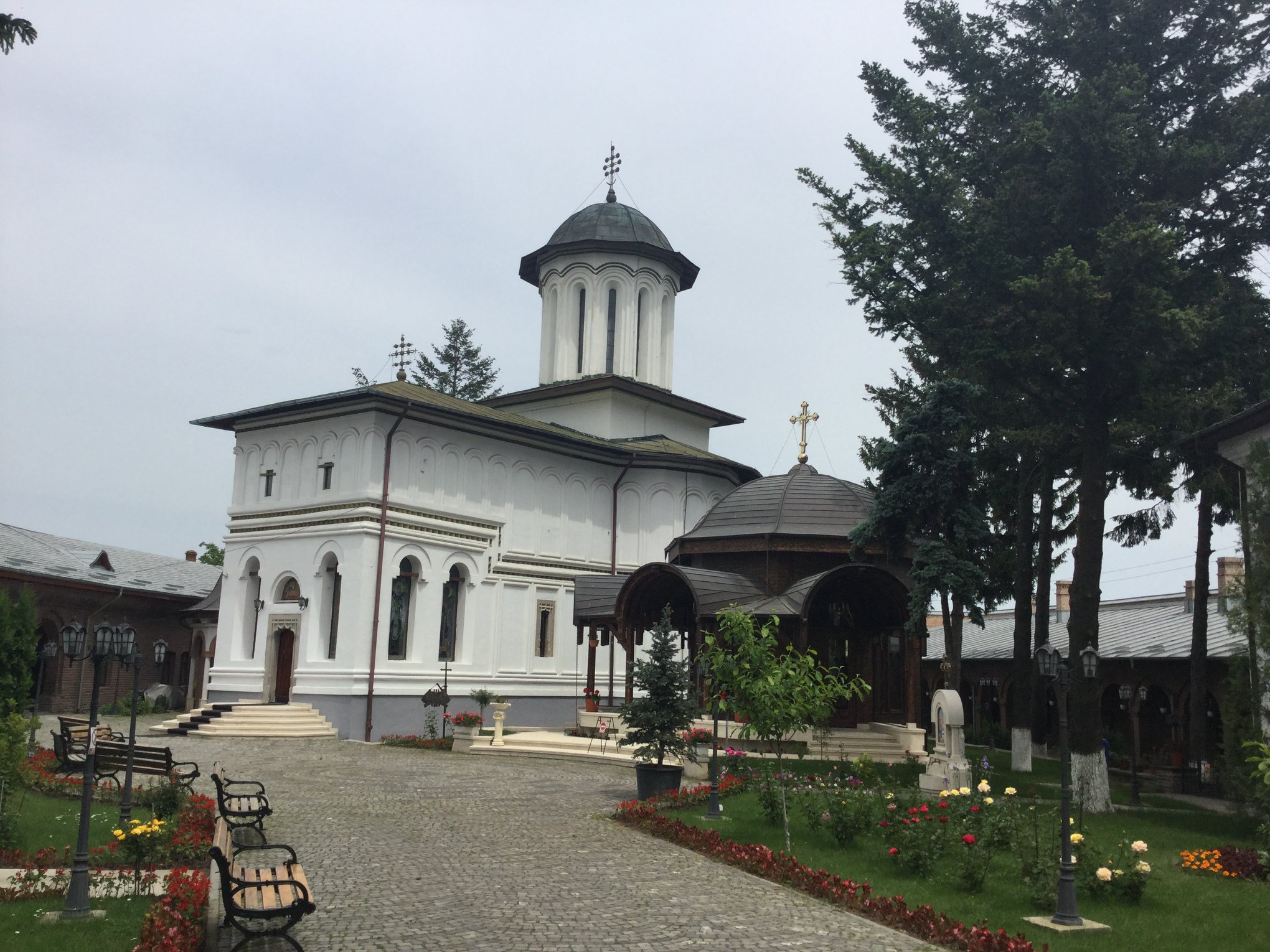
Plumbuita Monastery

The Plumbuita Monastery (Romanian: Mănăstirea Plumbuita) is a Romanian Orthodox monastery located at 58 Plumbuita Street in Bucharest, Romania. Its church is dedicated to Saint John the Baptist.

== History ==
One narrative holds that the monastery was founded by Prince Vlad VI Înecatul in 1531. In order to rid himself of boyar opponents, the ruler had sent them to support his Moldavian counterpart in fighting Poland at the Battle of Obertyn. Work in masonry began on the very spot from which the standard-bearers had ridden away. Mircea the Shepherd served as Ispravnic, while the head workman was Dan of Argeș. Reportedly, after Vlad was assassinated by drowning the following year, his widow Ana ordered that the construction site be sealed with lead (plumbuită). It remained thus until the reign of her nephew, Peter the Younger, with involvement from Doamna Chiajna, her sister and Peter's mother. Another version suggests Radu Paisie as ktetor. The oldest known printing press in Bucharest was established on the site in 1582; it belonged to the Metropolis of Ungro-Wallachia.

The earliest surviving document about the monastery dates to 1585; issued by Mihnea Turcitul, it is a deed placing it under the authority of the Xeropotamou Monastery on Mount Athos. The document mentions several ktetors: Peter, Alexander II Mircea and especially Mihnea and his mother Catherine Salvaresso, who are credited with building "a most beautiful large church". The monastery was burned by Ottoman troops in 1595, following the Battle of Călugăreni. It was soon rebuilt by Michael the Brave, who donated it to a village. Radu Mihnea made a donation by deed in 1614. In 1647, Matei Basarab re-founded the monastery in memory of his victory over Radu Iliaș and of his fallen supporters. The appearance of the complex, restored in the 20th century, dates to this period. The work begun by Basarab was the most ample until the early 19th century, especially involving the bell tower and church. He also built the princely house, the city's oldest residence.

The 1806 pisanie records that the monastery was destroyed by the 1802 earthquake, to be rebuilt with money from a Dionysius of Ioannina. An 1838 registry notes the presence of the wooden-roofed abbot's (princely) house, a masonry kitchen building and monastic cells, all in good repair. In 1848, the Imperial Russian forces occupying the area proposed transforming the monastery into a prison, a situation that lasted sporadically until the 1863 secularization of monastic estates. At that point, it ceased to be a monastery, becoming a parish church. Due to a lack of funds, the entire complex fell into ruins. A first restoration took place from 1933 to 1940, involving the princely house, yard, bell tower and church. Work continued between 1945 and 1957, when it was re-sanctified as a monastery.

== Description ==
The monastery is situated within an irregularly shaped courtyard oriented from southwest to northeast, itself located inside an orchard that contains several structures, such as the bell foundry. The yard features the bell tower in the center of the southwest side; the abbot's house to the left and the cells to the right; and adjacent to the latter, the princely house, for a time a museum dedicated to Basarab's era, but since the early 1990s a workshop for religious objects. The powerful surrounding wall dates to the time of Basarab. The 1647 kitchen, the country's oldest such structure, is on the northwest side. It is linked to the houses by a series of brick pillars and arches built during the restoration of the mid-20th century.

The church is situated in the farther half of the yard, close to the kitchen. It is probably a rebuilt 16th-century version of a church founded by Alexander II Mircea during the preceding century. Its small narthex recalls the church at Dealu Monastery. When restoration began in 1933, it had no domes and the portico was walled in. The nave dome was rebuilt, but the narthex domes were not, perhaps corresponding to the original design. The cross-shaped church measures 21 meters long by 7 to 10.5 meters wide. Unusually, it is oriented to the northeast, giving the nave an irregular trapezoidal shape, rather than the typical square. This deviation probably stems from an error in drawing the foundations.

The altar apse is pentagonal on the exterior and elliptical on the interior. Due to the erroneously planned foundation, the apse ceiling is slightly elliptical. The altar is divided from the nave by a masonry iconostasis from the 20th century. The altar has two niches in its thick walls. The nave ceiling has arches extending from the three apses, as well as a large vaulted arch linking nave and narthex, holding up the vaulted ceiling, added after the 1802 earthquake. The Pantocrator dome, added during the last restoration, rises above, but is not connected to the interior space. The very narrow narthex is divided from the nave by three arches resting on two octagonal masonry columns. The walls to the side of these have irregularly shaped plaster, indicating the earlier presence of another wall. It is possible that the original church was very short, ending there. The structure was probably expanded under Mihnea or Matei Basarab, who added the portico. The narthex has a double ceiling, with two transverse arches reducing the surface area. Similar ceilings are found at Dealu and Arnota; Basarab is responsible for the latter, as well as for Plumbuita.

The portico has a ceiling similar to the one in the narthex. It resembles the porticoes at Plătărești, Flămânda and especially Gura Motrului, which has equally high and narrow arches and the same full wall, in the center of the western facade, with an opening for the portal and a niche for the patron saint's icon. The exterior facades are divided into two equal sections by a massive three-row string course typical of the 16th century. The upper part features frames with semicircular arches, while the ones below are rectangular. The monastery complex is listed as a historic monument by Romania's Ministry of Culture and Religious Affairs; the church, princely house, bell tower and cells are listed separately.
