= Vintilă of Wallachia =

Ruler of Wallachia

Vintilă of Wallachia was the son of Pătrașcu cel Bun. He briefly ruled Wallachia in May 1574.

Vintilă of Wallachia House of Drăculeşti Died: ?
Regnal titles
Preceded by Alexandru II Mircea	Voivode of Wallachia; 1574	Succeeded by Alexandru II Mircea
