= Peter the Younger =

Peter the Younger (Petru cel Tânăr)
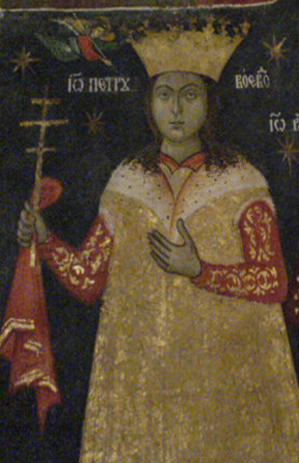
- Portrait from the Snagov Monastery

Voivode of Wallachia with Doamna Chiajna of Moldavia (1559–1564)
- Reign: 25 September 1559 – 8 June 1568
- Predecessor: Mircea the Shepherd
- Successor: Alexandru II Mircea
- Born: 1547; Principality of Wallachia
- Died: 19 August 1569 (aged 21–22); Konya, Ottoman Empire
- Spouse: Doamna Jelena Crepović
- House: House of Drăculești
- Father: Mircea the Shepherd
- Mother: Doamna Chiajna of Moldavia
- Religion: Eastern Orthodox Church

Peter the Younger (Romanian: Petru cel Tânăr) (1547 – 19 August 1569) was the Voivode (Prince) of Wallachia between 25 September 1559 and 8 June 1568. The eldest son of Mircea the Shepherd and Doamna Chiajna, he was named "the Young" because, at the moment of crowning, he was only 13.

== Reign ==
After the death of his father on 21 September 1559, the Boyars of Wallachia attempted to take the throne from the family. Between 25 September and 24 October 1559, three battles took place between the Boyars and the remaining family of Mircea the Shepherd. The first battle, from the village Românești, was won by the boyars, only to lose the second battle, of Șerpătești. The decisive battle took place at Boiani where, Peter, helped by the Ottomans, won. On 24 October 1559, Peter, who was still a minor was confirmed by the Sublime Porte as the new ruler of Wallachia. Peter was totally different from his father, having a mild and religious nature. Because he was too young, the country was led by his capable mother Lady Chiajna, who was able to neutralize the intrigues of the pretenders to the throne and the manoeuvres of King of Hungary.

== Death ==
Attempting to secure the wealth of both the family and the state, the Ottoman Empire, through a representative, managed to send the young prince in exile along with his mother, Lady Chiajna in 1568. Peter the Younger arrived in Constantinople on 31 May and was taken to the Seven Towers fortress, where he was stripped of his riches. On 19 August 1569, Peter the Younger died of poisoning in Konya in Asia Minor, he was only 21 years old. He was buried in the Church of the Transfiguration in the same locality.

== Legacy ==
Peter established the Plumbuita Monastery in 1560 and continued his father's work on restoring the Curtea Veche Church and the Snagov Monastery.

== Notes ==
Vlad V cel Tânăr House of Basarab; Drăculești branch Born: 1547 Died: 19 August 1568
Regnal titles
Preceded by Mircea the Shepherd	Voivode of Wallachia; 1559–1568	Succeeded by Alexander II Mircea
