= Mihnea Turcitul =

Prince of Walalchia (1564–1601)

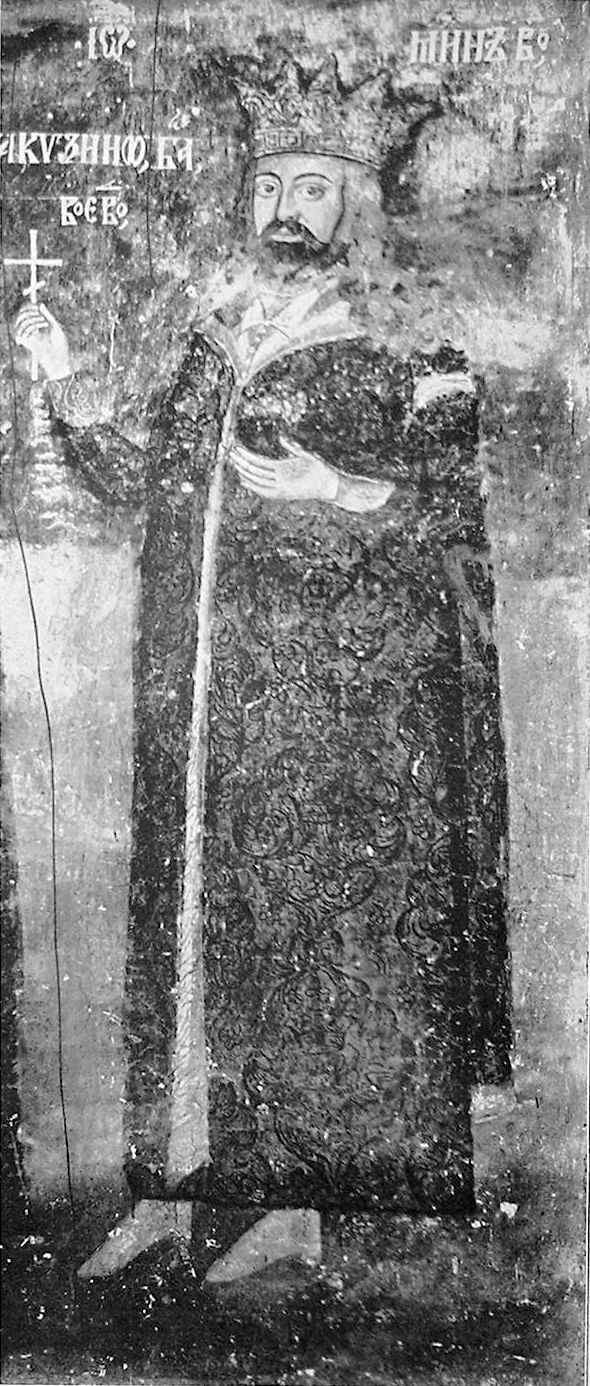

Prince of Wallachia (1st reign)
- Reign: 11 September 1577 – July 1583
- Predecessor: Alexander II Mircea
- Successor: Petru Cercel

Prince of Wallachia (2nd reign)
- Reign: 6 April 1585 – 19 May 1591
- Predecessor: Petru Cercel
- Successor: Ștefan Surdul
- Born: July 1564; Beyoğlu
- Died: October 1601 (aged 37); Istanbul
- Spouse: Neaga, Voica
- Issue: Radu Mihnea
- Dynasty: Drăculești
- Father: Alexandru II Mircea
- Mother: Catherine Salvaresso
- Religion: Sunni Islam prev. Eastern Orthodoxy

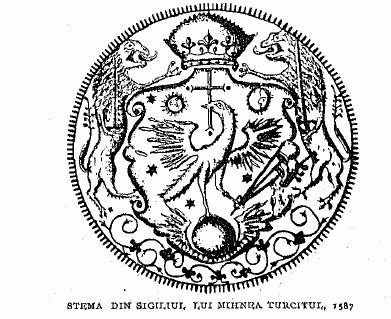
Mihnea Turcitul's official seal

Mihnea II Turcitul ("Mihnea the Turned-Turk"; July 1564 – October 1601) was Prince (Voivode) of Wallachia between September 1577 and July 1583, and again from April 1585 to May 1591.

== Rise to the throne ==
The only son of Alexandru II Mircea and Ecaterina Salvaresso, he ascended to the throne after events characteristic for the decline in prestige of local custom and princely power under pressure from the Ottoman Empire (Wallachia's suzerain): Mihnea had to compete with a foreign pretender, the Lombard physician Rosso, who claimed to be descended from a Wallachian ruler, and ultimately succeeded after enlisting the help of his grandmother, the influential Lady Chiajna.

== Unpopular taxation policy ==
He, Ecaterina Salvaresso and Chiajna subsequently established what would become a highly unpopular rule, which followed the political guidelines imposed by Alexandru II, and saw a major increase in taxes — around 1583, the pressure was leading peasants to abandon their plots and flee to Transylvania in large numbers.

== Exile to Tripoli ==
Local boyars unsuccessfully petitioned the Porte citing Mihnea's youth, began talks with a certain Pătrașcu or Radul Popa (who claimed to be the son of Pătrașcu cel Bun), and eventually rebelled in Oltenia (under the leadership of the Craiovești family). A more powerful pretender was the real son of Pătrașcu cel Bun, Petru Cercel, who held the throne from 1583 to 1585, provoking Mihnea's exile to Tripoli (where he was kept in custody by Ottoman authorities).

== Financial promises to the Ottoman Grand Vizier and the Sultan ==
His wealthy mother's family gave gifts to the officials of the sultan, in order to purchase back the throne. The obligations he contracted in order to have Petru removed (around 700,000 scudi) forced Mihnea to increase the fiscal burden, and especially the quit-rent, to even higher levels upon his return to Bucharest. In addition, Mihnea allegedly promised Grand Vizier Koca Sinan Pasha as many gold coins as 600 horses could carry, in order to have Petru killed; in March 1590, his request was granted by Sultan Murad III, who ordered Petru's execution, in exchange for 70,000 gold coins.

== Deposition ==
One year after his mother Catherine's death, the Turks removed Mihnea for the second time. Despite the established contacts, the Ottomans deposed Mihnea, in favor of Ștefan Surdul (who was allegedly a leather cutter and harness maker by trade). After moving to Anatolia, he bade without success for the throne in Moldavia.

== Conversion to Islam and life in Nikopolis ==
In a desperate attempt to regain the throne, Mihnea and his eldest son converted to Islam. This is why he is known as "Turcitul" or "the Islamized". The move qualified him for Ottoman administrative office - he was awarded the sanjak of Nikopolis (in today's Bulgaria), under the name of Mehmed (or Mehmet) Bey. These un-traditional gestures did not prevent his youngest son, Radu Mihnea, from becoming Prince in 1601.

== Death in Istanbul ==
He died in Istanbul in 1601 and was buried in an unmarked grave.

Preceded by Alexandru II Mircea	Voivode of Wallachia; 1577–1583	Succeeded by Petru Cercel
Preceded by Petru Cercel	Voivode of Wallachia; 1585–1591	Succeeded by Ștefan Surdul
