= Alexandru II =

Alexandru II may refer to:

- Alexandru II Mircea (Hospodar of Wallachia from 1568 to 1574 and 1574 to 1577)
- Alexandru II Ghica (1796–1862)
