= Curtea Veche =

Palace or residence built in 1459

Coordinates: 44°25′48.53″N 26°6′3.47″E

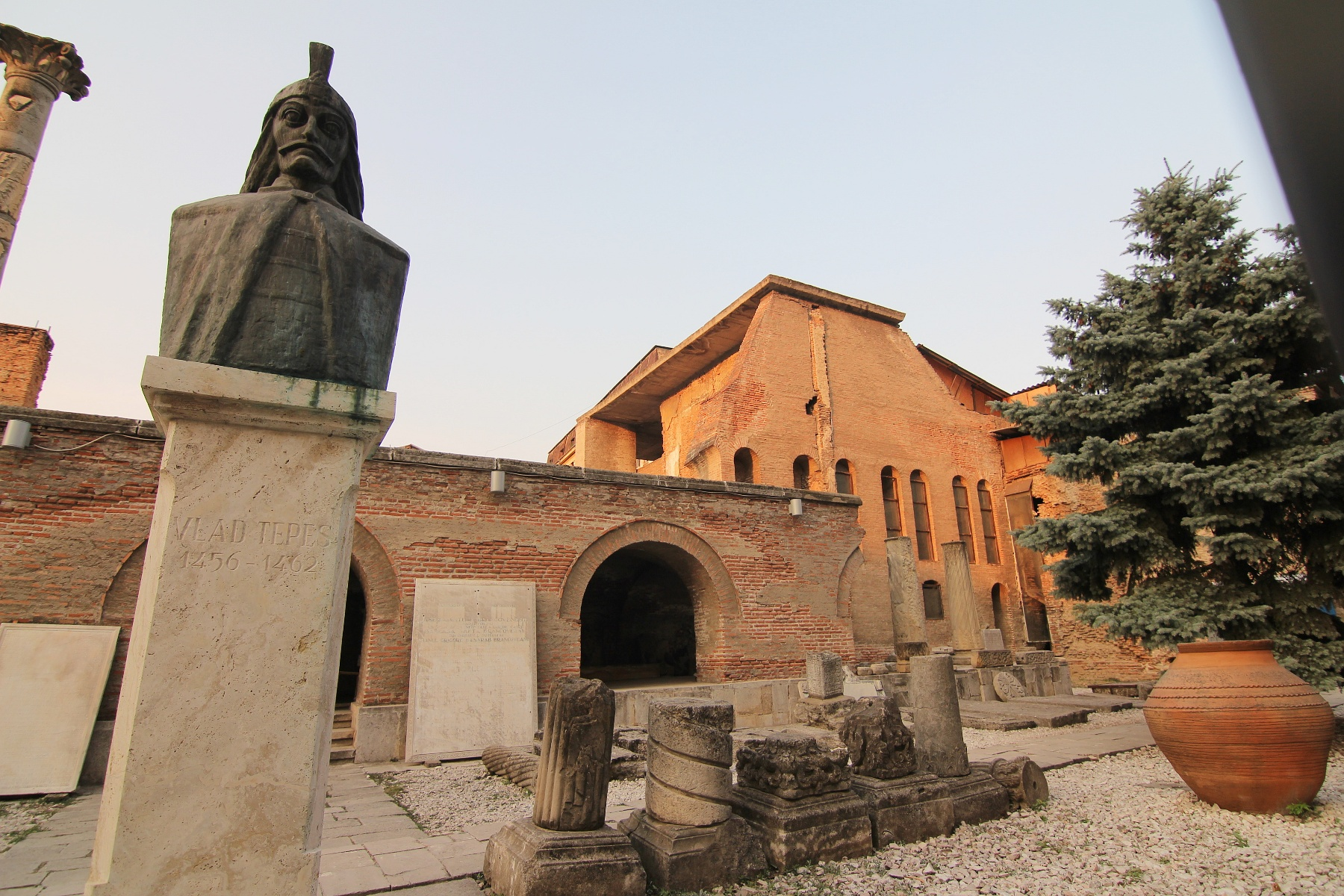
Curtea Veche (September 24, 2011) with the bust of Vlad Țepeș by Dumitru Pasima

Curtea Veche (the Old Princely Court) was built as a palace or residence during the rule of Vlad III Dracula in 1459. Archaeological excavations started in 1953, and now the site is operated by the Muzeul Municipiului București in the historic centre of Bucharest, Romania.

== Voivode’s Palace ==
Vlad the Impaler's reign was dominated by conflicts with the Ottoman Empire, hence the necessity to permanently watch over and protect the southern border, the Danube, made him stay in the fortified town on the Dâmbovița banks. He issued a Latin document on 13 June 1458 from the area of current Bucharest. Then, on 20 September 1459, he issued a document in Slavonic, specifically referring to the "fortress" in Bucharest, his "princely residence". Other documents were issued in 1460 and 1461. Vlad would have been accompanied by his family, courtiers, and an army corps.

During his reign, Mircea Ciobanul repaired the palace, and defined the limits of the city. His palace became the economic nucleus of Bucharest, surrounded by the houses of traders and craftsmen known as the Lipscani. Matei Basarab repaired the palace during his own reign, so that it was "completely rebuilt...amazingly elegant" with a "charming aspect, much finer and gayer". Constantin Brâncoveanu rebuilt and extended the palace using stone, including a great marble staircase at the entrance.

Alexander Ypsilantis built a new princely court in 1775 at Dealul Spirii. The old court was auctioned in 1798 by Constantine Hangerli.

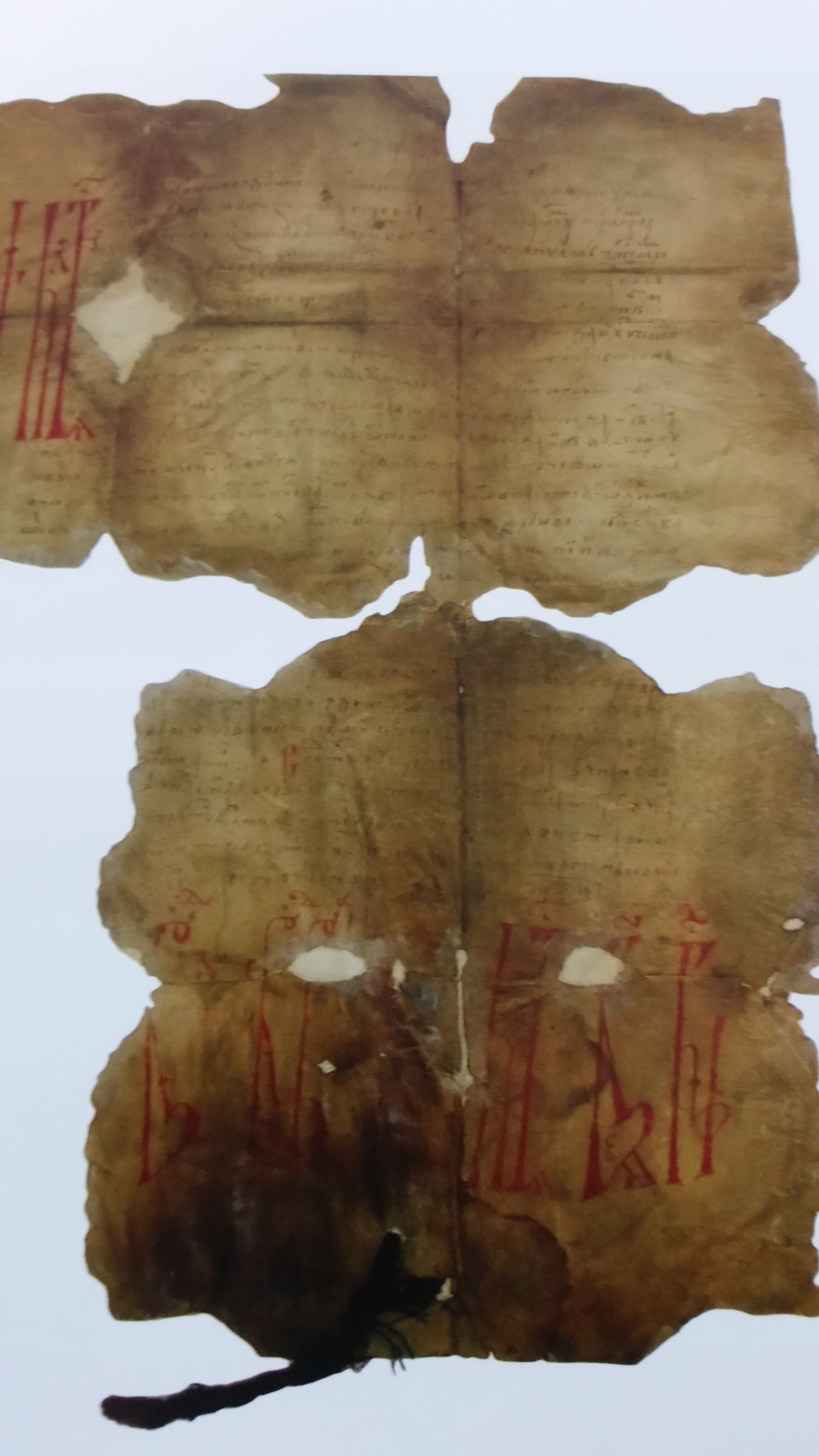
Vlad Țepeș document establishing his court here on 20 September 1459

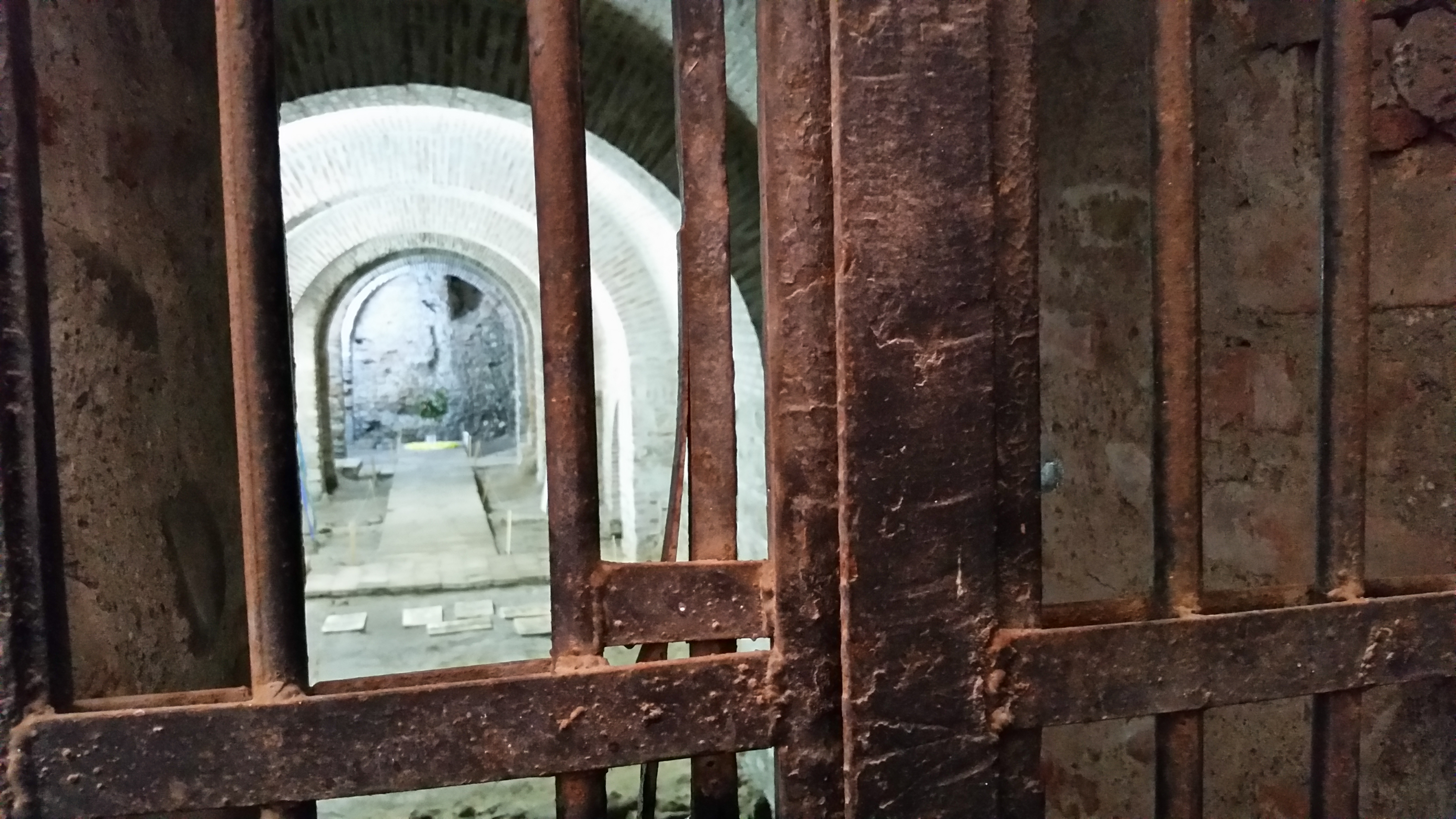
Palatul Voievodal interior

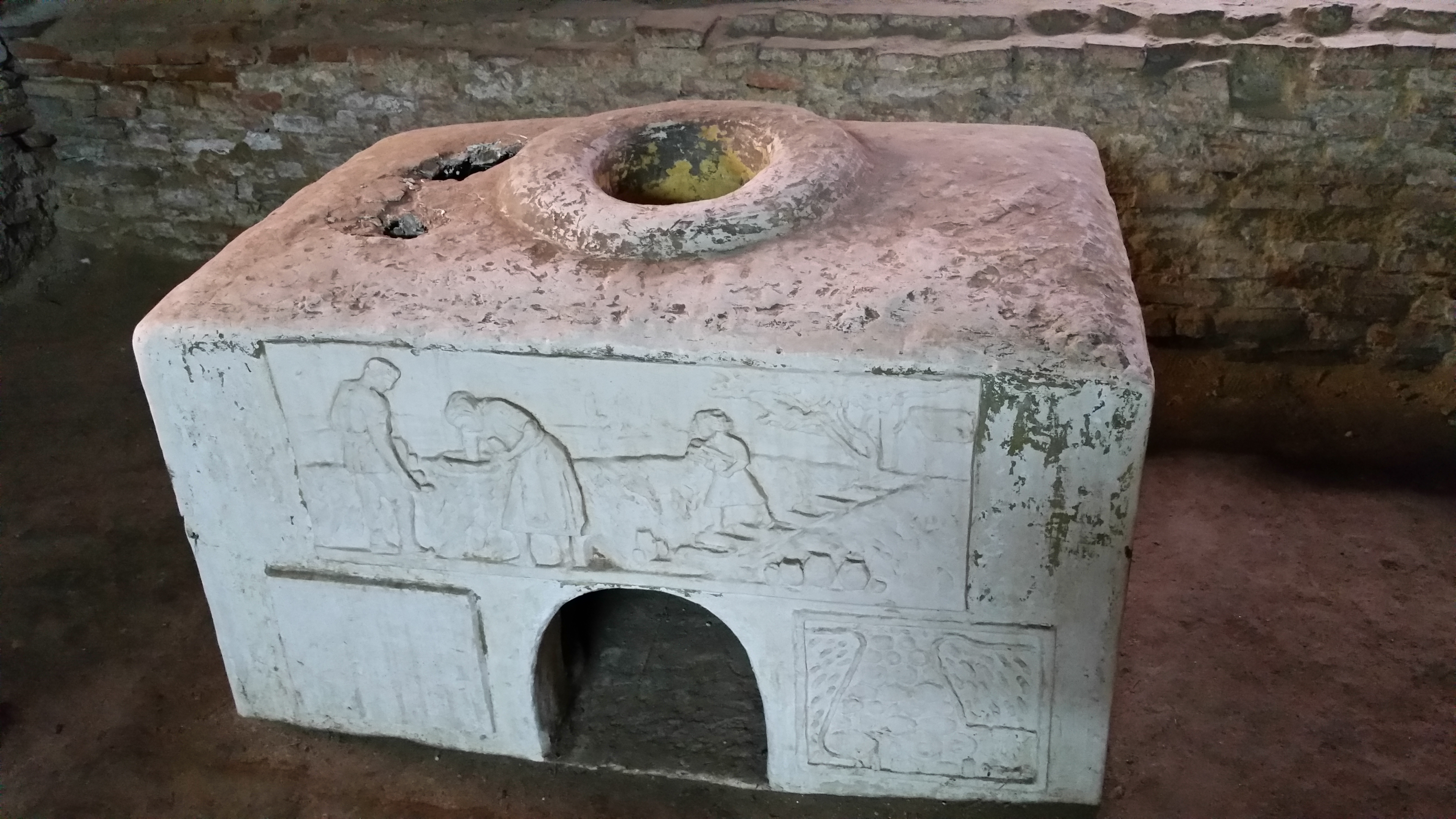
Palatul Voievodal oven

== Annunciation Church of Saint Anthony ==
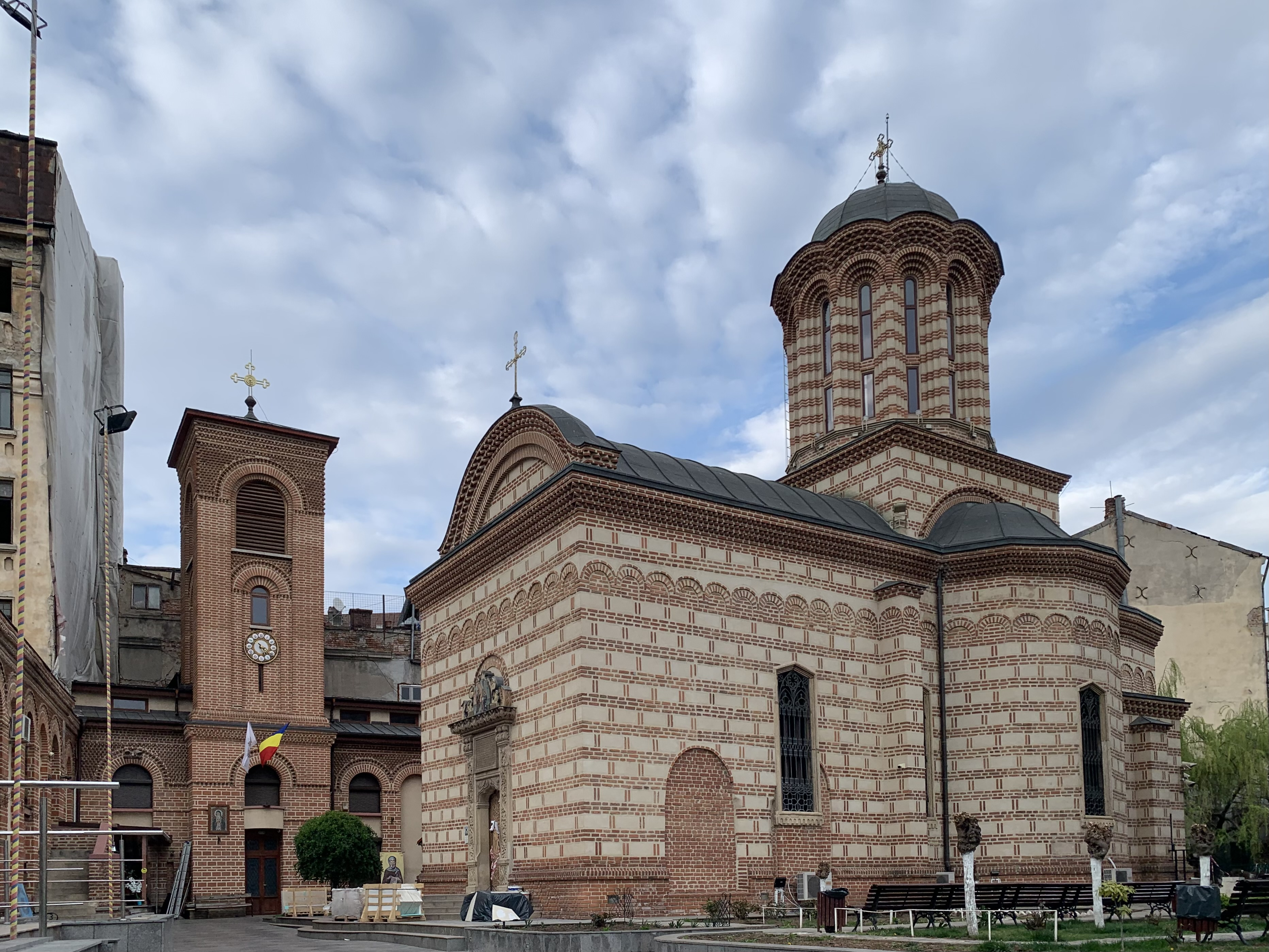
Curtea Veche Church (2023)

This princely church was built by Mircea Ciobanul in 1559, and is the location of his grave. The church is "the oldest religious building maintained in its original aspect in Bucharest".

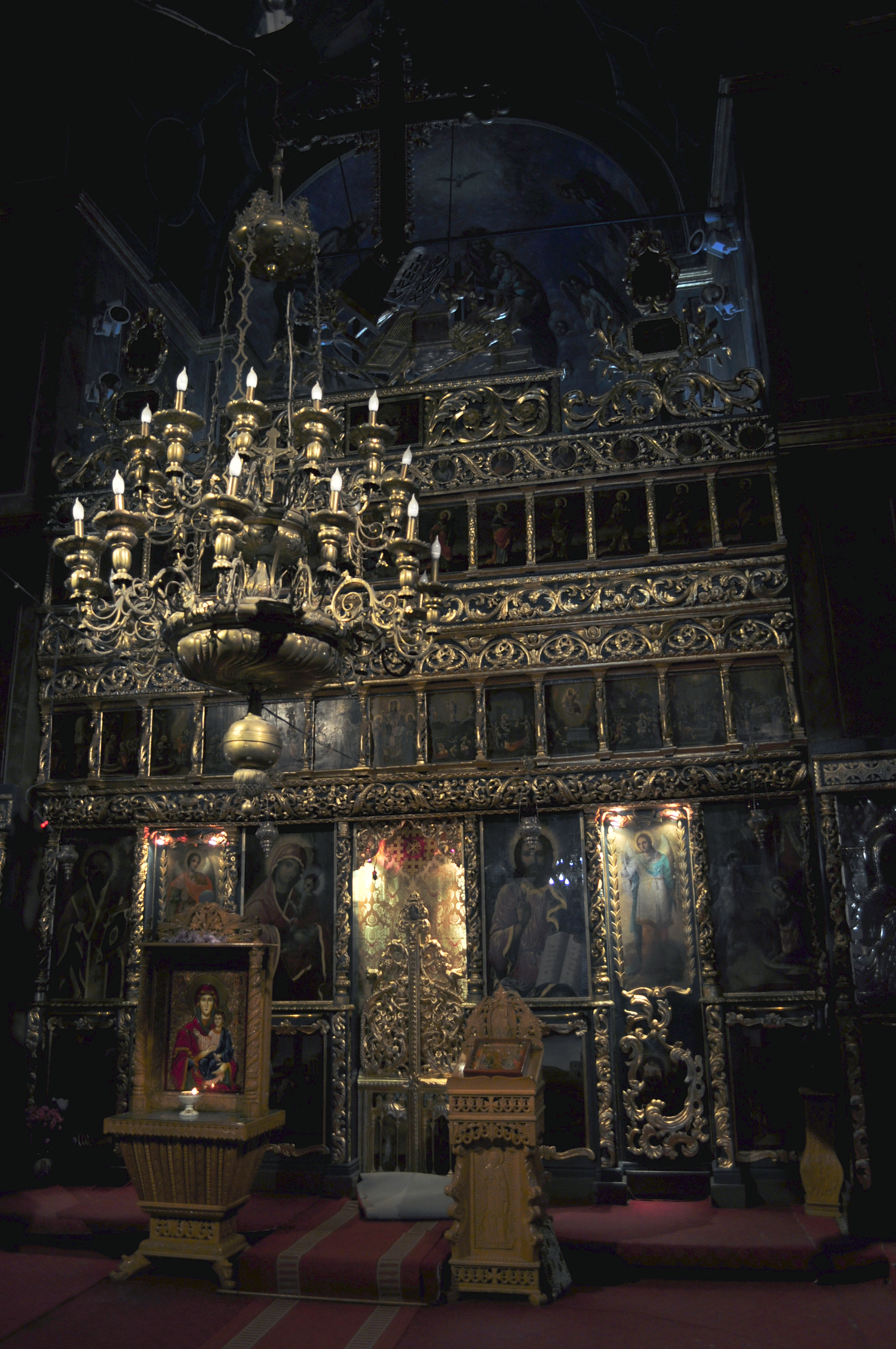
Biserica Sfântul Anton altar

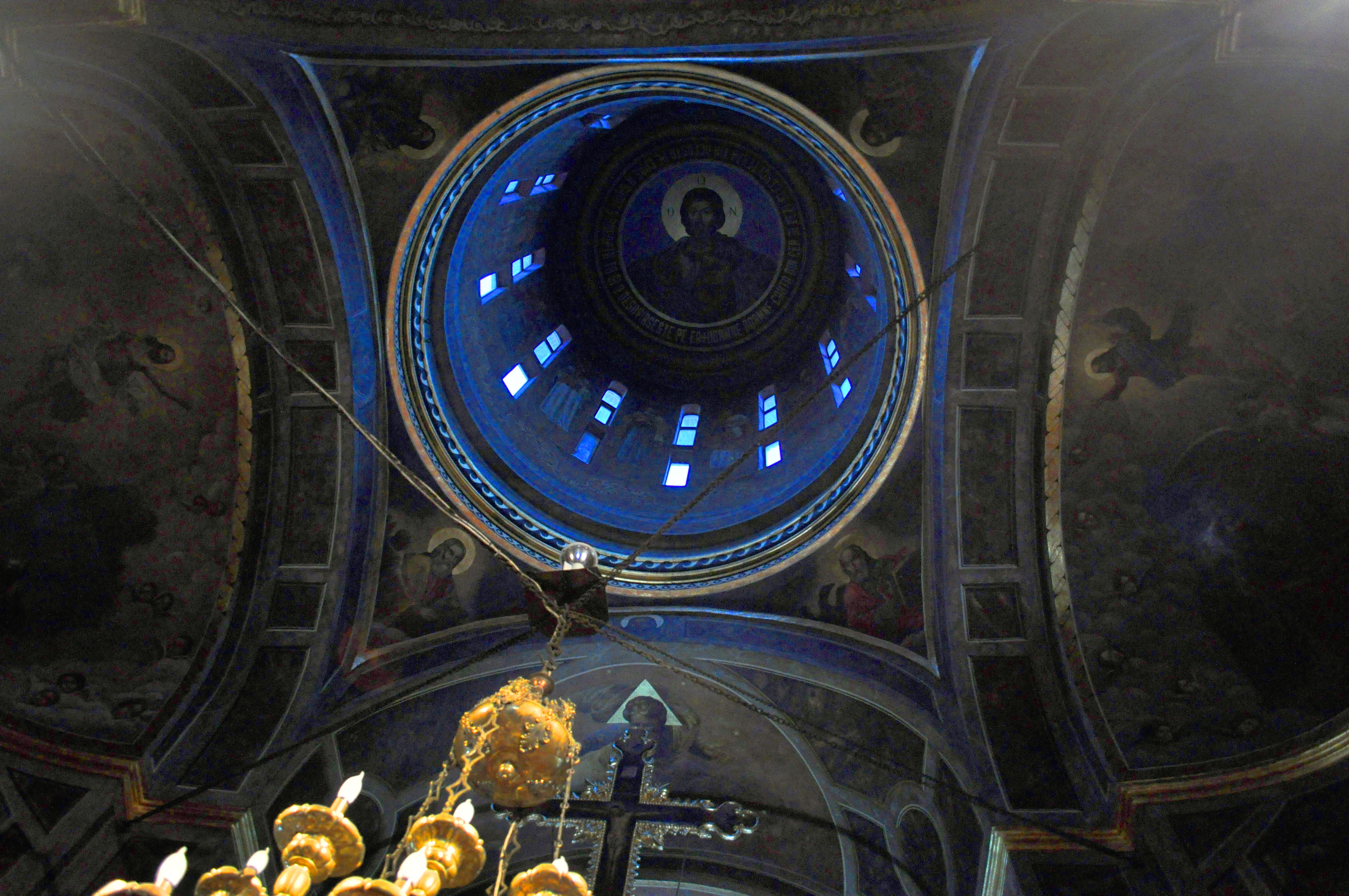
Biserica Sfântul Anton dome

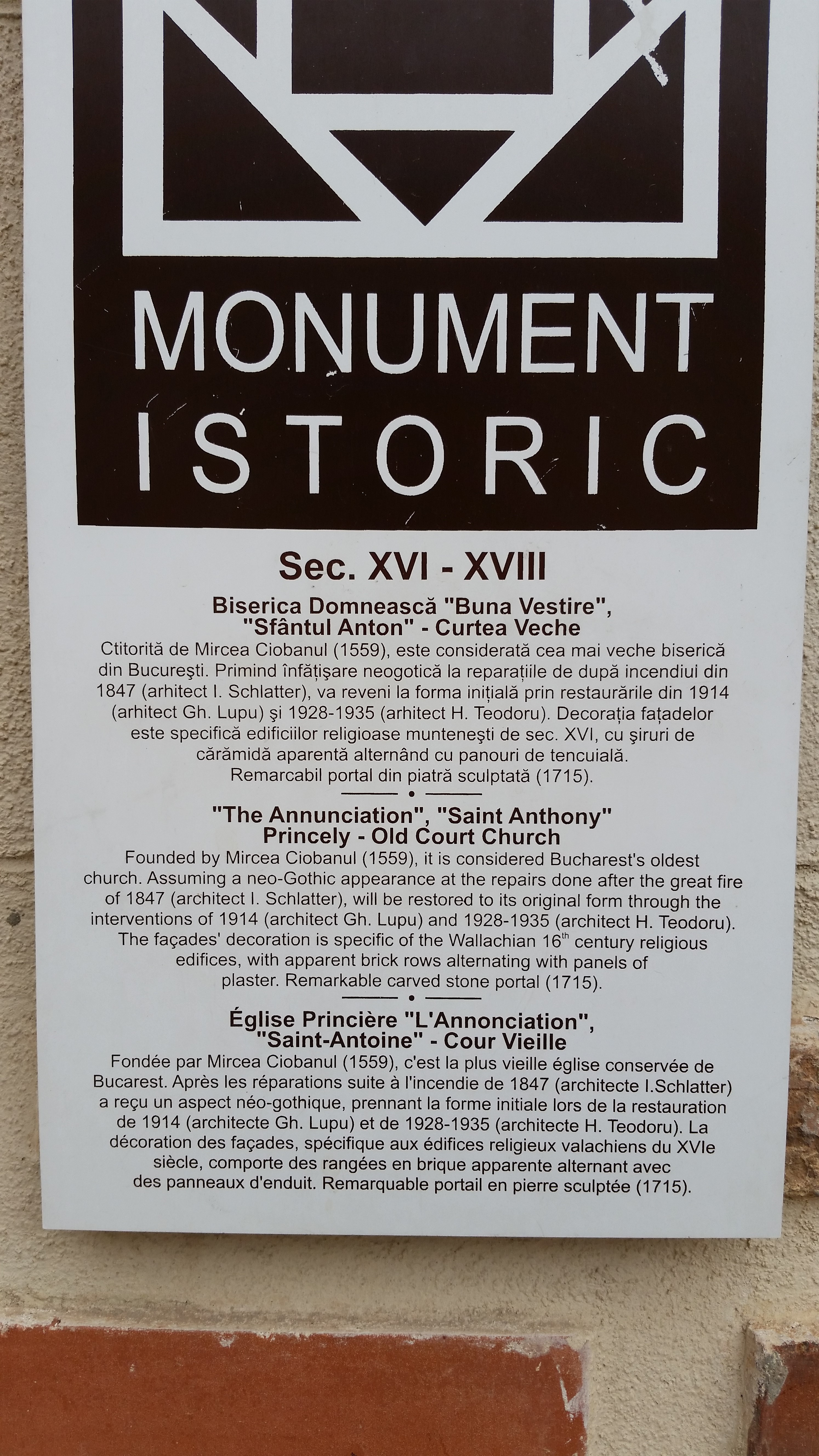
Biserica Sfântul Anton marker

== Popular culture ==
In its current role as a museum, the palace and neighbourhood inspired Mateiu Caragiale to write his novel Craii de Curtea-Veche. It is also at the center of efforts to restore the historic center of Bucharest.

== See also ==
- Bucharest Old Town
