= Colentina, Bucharest =

Neighborhood in Bucharest, Romania

Coordinates: 44°28′N 26°09′E

Colentina on the map of Bucharest

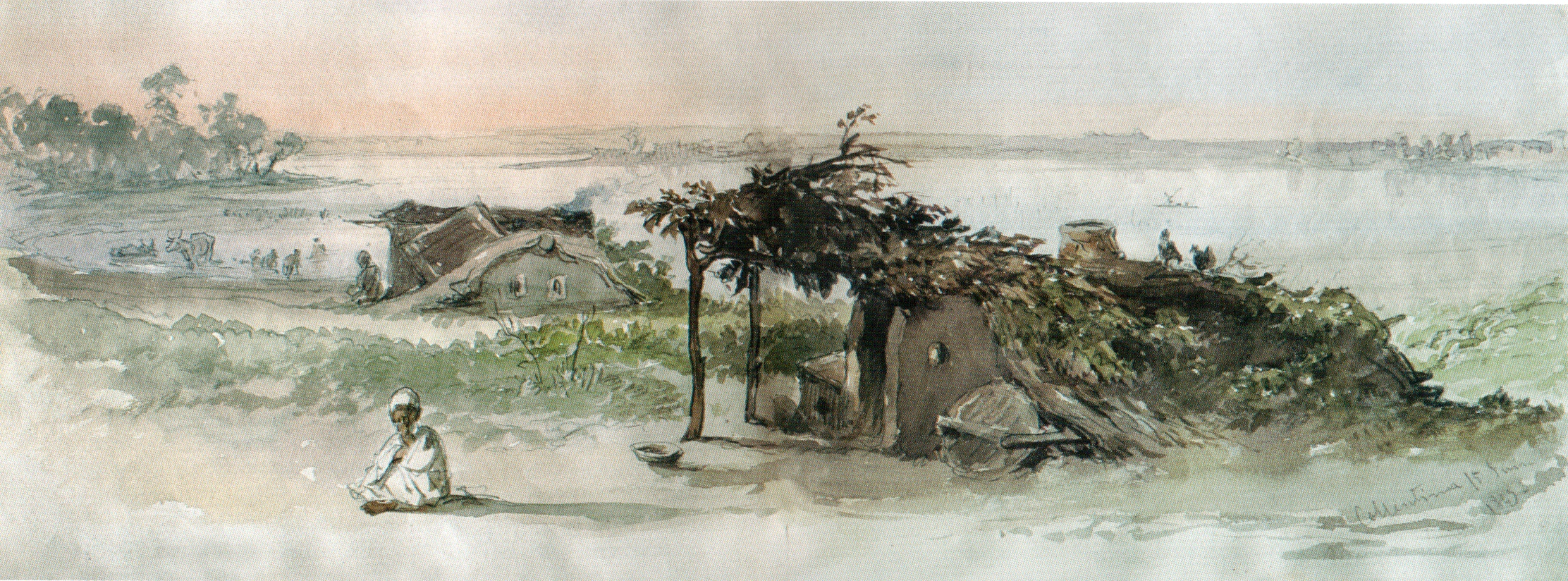
A hut in the village of Colentina, 1869 watercolour by Amedeo Preziosi

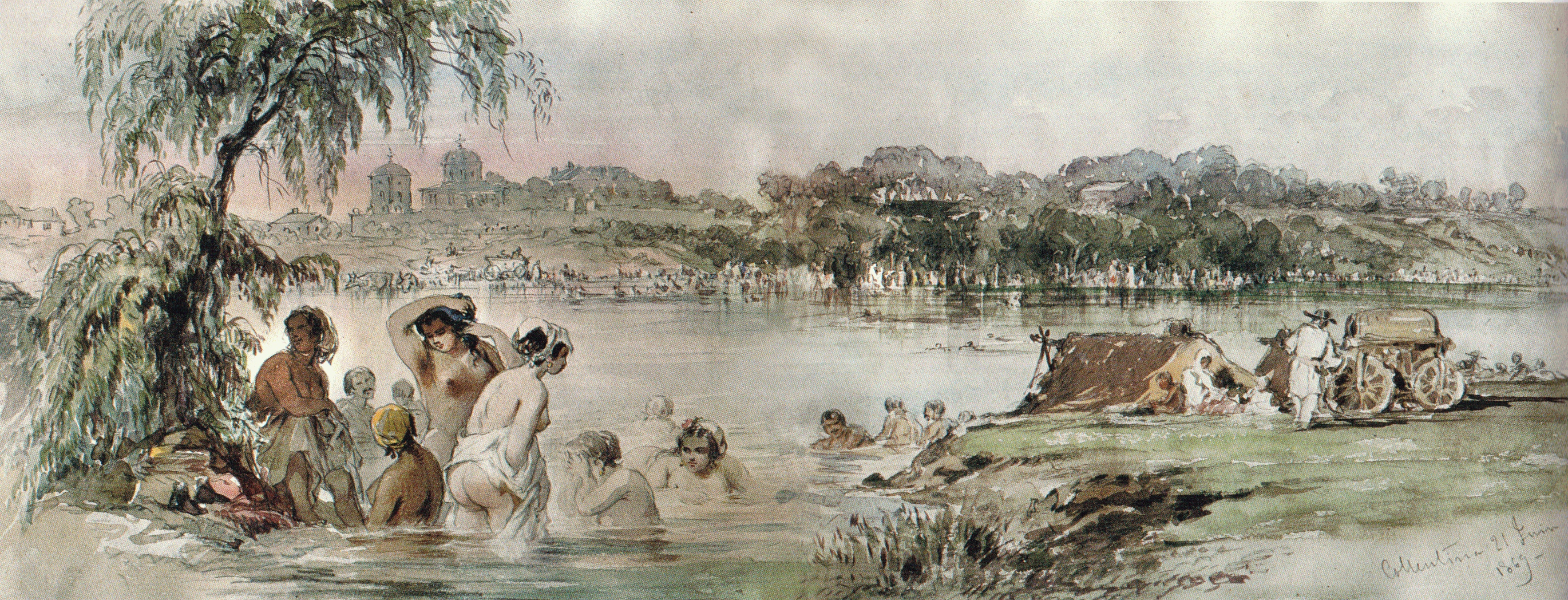
Bathers in the Colentina river, 1869 watercolour by Amedeo Preziosi

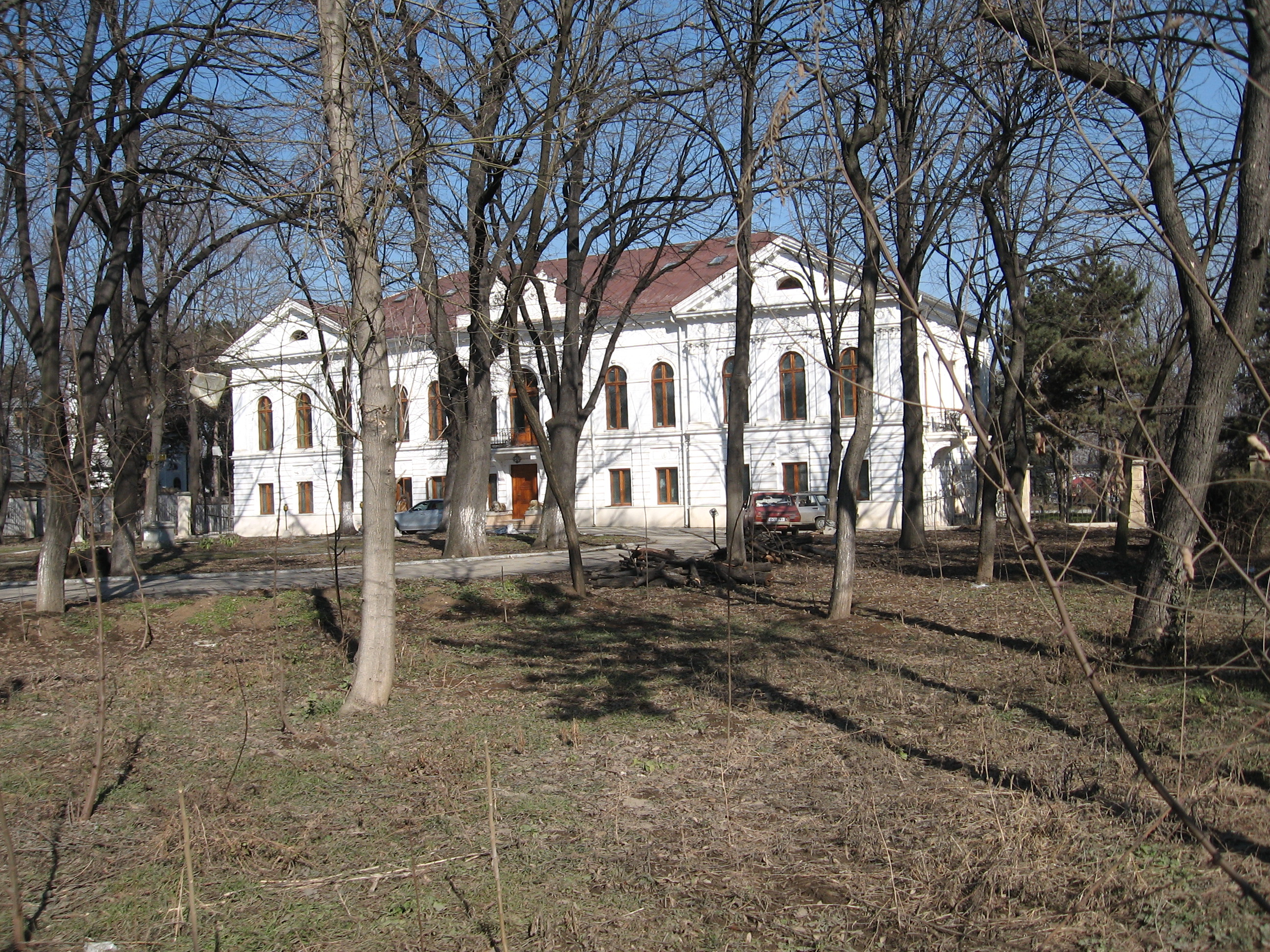
Ghica Palace

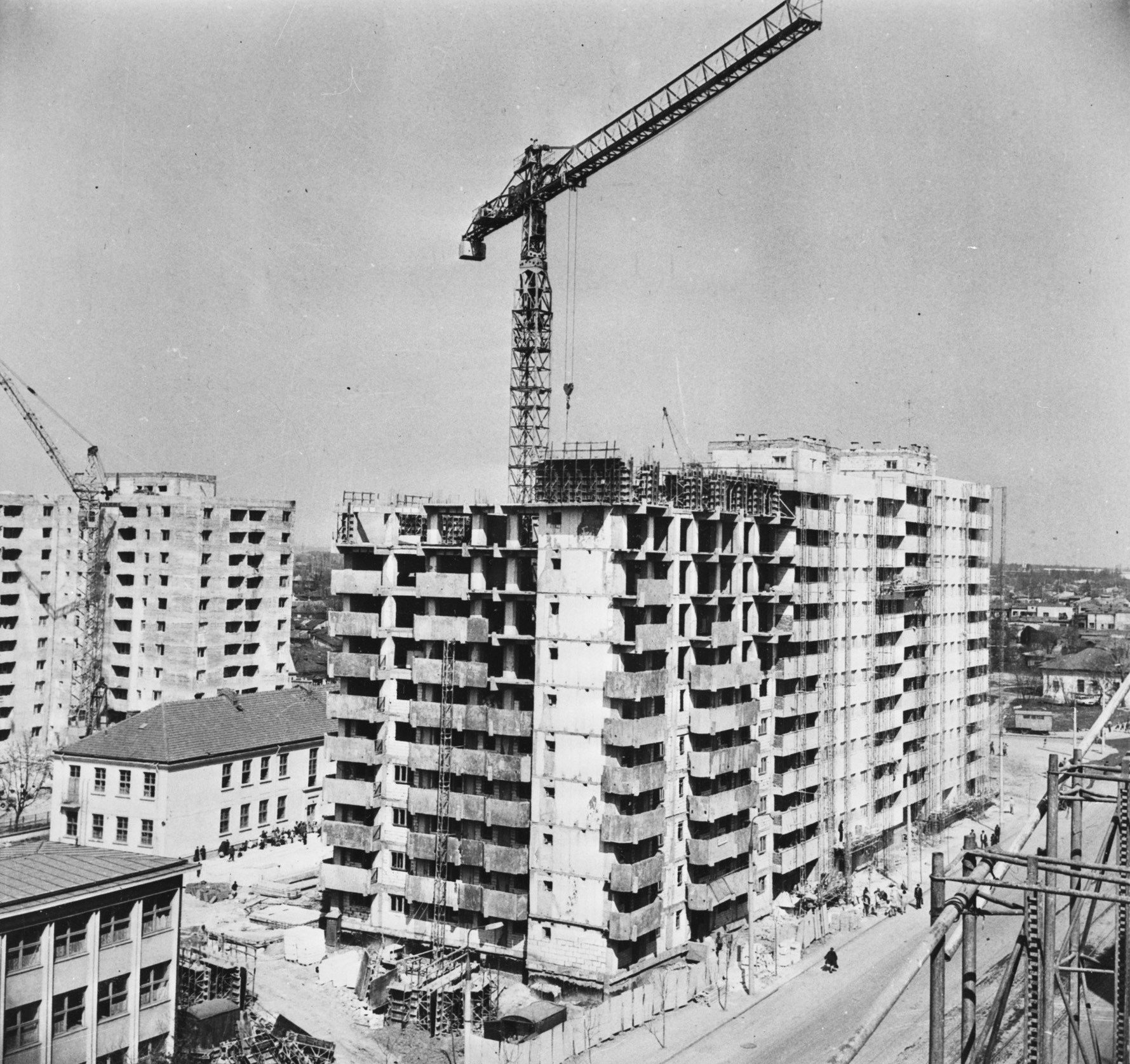
New apartment blocks being built on Colentina Avenue, May 1977

Colentina is a neighbourhood in Bucharest's Sector 2. It is located on the north-east of the city and is named after the nearby Colentina River.

== Name ==
A local folk etymology says that the name is derived from "colea-n-tină" (there, in the mud), this being the answer given by a spătar to Matei Basarab, who asked the former where he had defeated the Ottoman army.

== History ==
=== Early history ===
Until the second half of the 18th century, the area of today's Colentina was forested, as it was on the map of Stolnic Constantin Cantacuzino. Nevertheless, archeologists found traces of small settlements in Colentina, dated from the 6th-7th century; in one of such settlements, archeologists found a Justinian-era Byzantine bronze coin dated 539.

=== Monastery estate ===
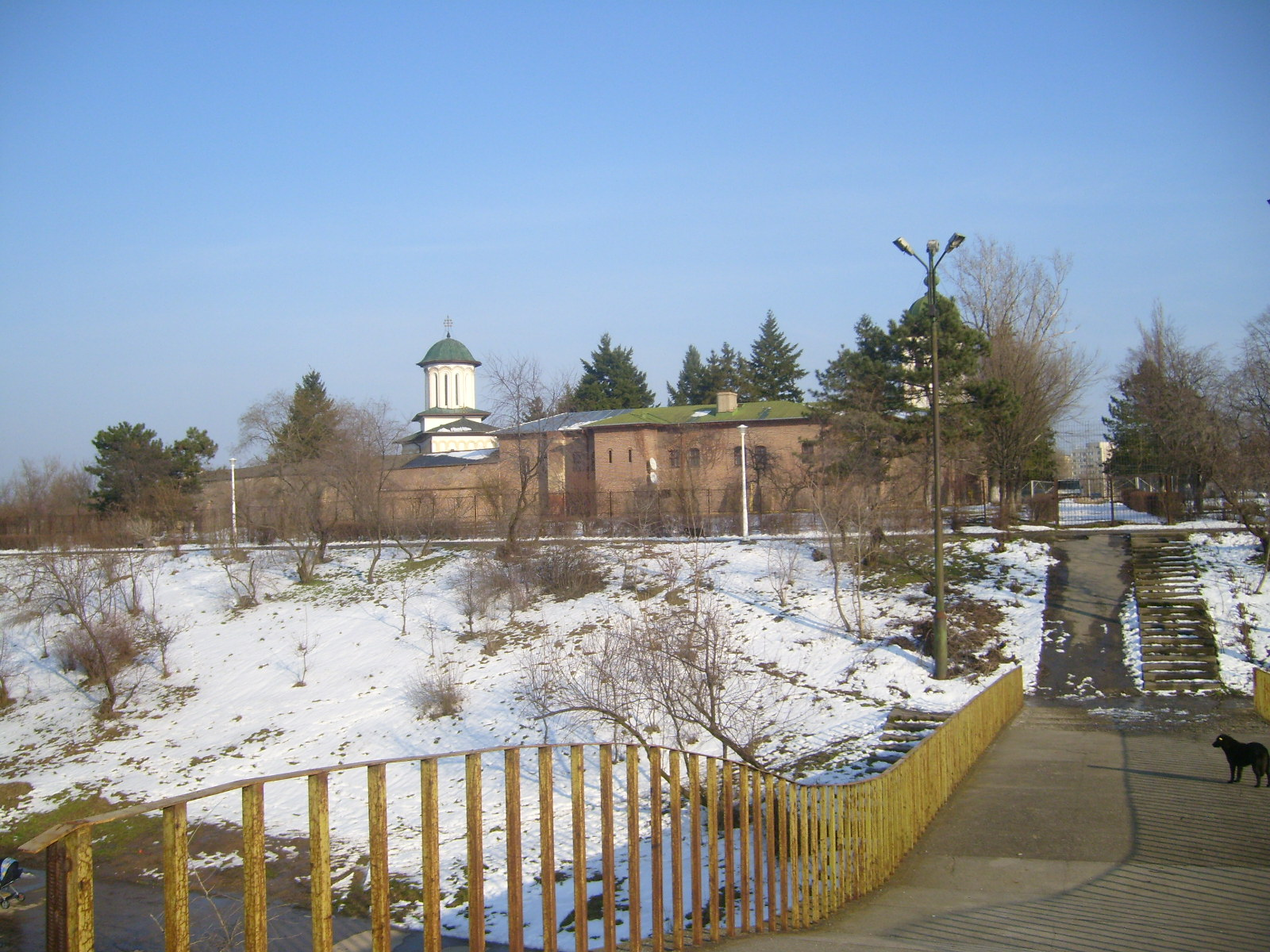
Plumbuita Monastery

The village of Colentina located near the Plumbuita Monastery was first mentioned on the map of H. C. Schütz of 1780 and on I. F. Schmidt's 1788 map. An Austrian map of 1791 shows the village as being located at the crossroad of the routes leading to Fundeni, Afumați, Ștefănești, and Pipera, with the high road bound for Bucharest. The earliest houses were built at the crossroad and around the Cârstienești Bridge across the Colentina river, close to the gate of the monastery.

Soon after, the Plumbuita Monastery, which owned the land in Colentina built and rented (embatic) grocer's shops, pubs, inns, as well as agricultural land. In the early 19th century, among the renters was the Paharnic Andronache Teohari, whose name was given to the Andronache estate in Northern Colentina, the name being still in use today.

The houses were built especially along the road towards Bucharest, while the houses on the island of the monastery were still spread out. Due to this, in 1837, the ocârmuitor of Ilfov County asked the hegumen of the monastery to donate plots for the peasants on the domains to build their houses according to a plan. The people who settled in Colentina were a heterogenous mix: some were Romanians from across Wallachia, others were Greeks, Bulgarians or Serbs.

During the 1821 revolts that preceded the Greek War of Independence, Alexander Ypsilantis and the Filiki Eteria, coming from Moldavia settled on the field on the Bucharest-ward bank of Colentina. The same place was used for the consecration of the flags of the first national militia in 1830 and the place where the first soldiers of the National Army took their oath of allegiance in 1834. After this, for a long time, the same field was used for military exercises.

=== Commune of Colentina-Fundeni ===
The 1863 law on the secularization of monastery estates in Romania made the Colentina estate property of the state and in March 1864, the rural commune of Colentina-Fundeni was created, which had three component villages: Plumbuita, Colentina and Fundeni. It was around this time that a primary school was built in the city.

Toward the end of the 19th century, Colentina continued to keep its agricultural economy, much of the land being owned by the large landowners, while the inhabitants owned only a sixth of the agricultural land. The commune had six abattoirs, three in Colentina and three in Plumbuita, killing around 12000 cows each year, the meat being then sold in Bucharest and to the 26 pubs and 5 inns that Colentina had at the time.

In the 1890s, the village of Colentina had a population of 254, the village of Plumbuita 288 and the village of Fundeni 279. The 1899 Romanian Census shows that three more villages were created in the commune: Andronache and Boldu, on the northern part of the former Plumbuita estate, while the Tei village was created around the Ghica Palace, the commune having a population of 1048, of which 46 foreign citizens, most of which Transylvanian refugees.

=== Bucharest neighbourhood ===
In 1939, Colentina, together with Pipera, Tei, Plumbuita, Andronache, and Fundeni were made part of Bucharest. The neighbourhood suffered a lot of modifications in the mid 1970s and 1980s when houses were replaced with 8-to-10-storey apartment blocks, like in Tei, Obor, and Calea Moșilor and has been recently the home of Arab and Chinese immigrants to Romania.
