= Curtea Veche Church =

Brâncovenesc brick church in Bucharest, Romania

- Biserica Curtea Veche
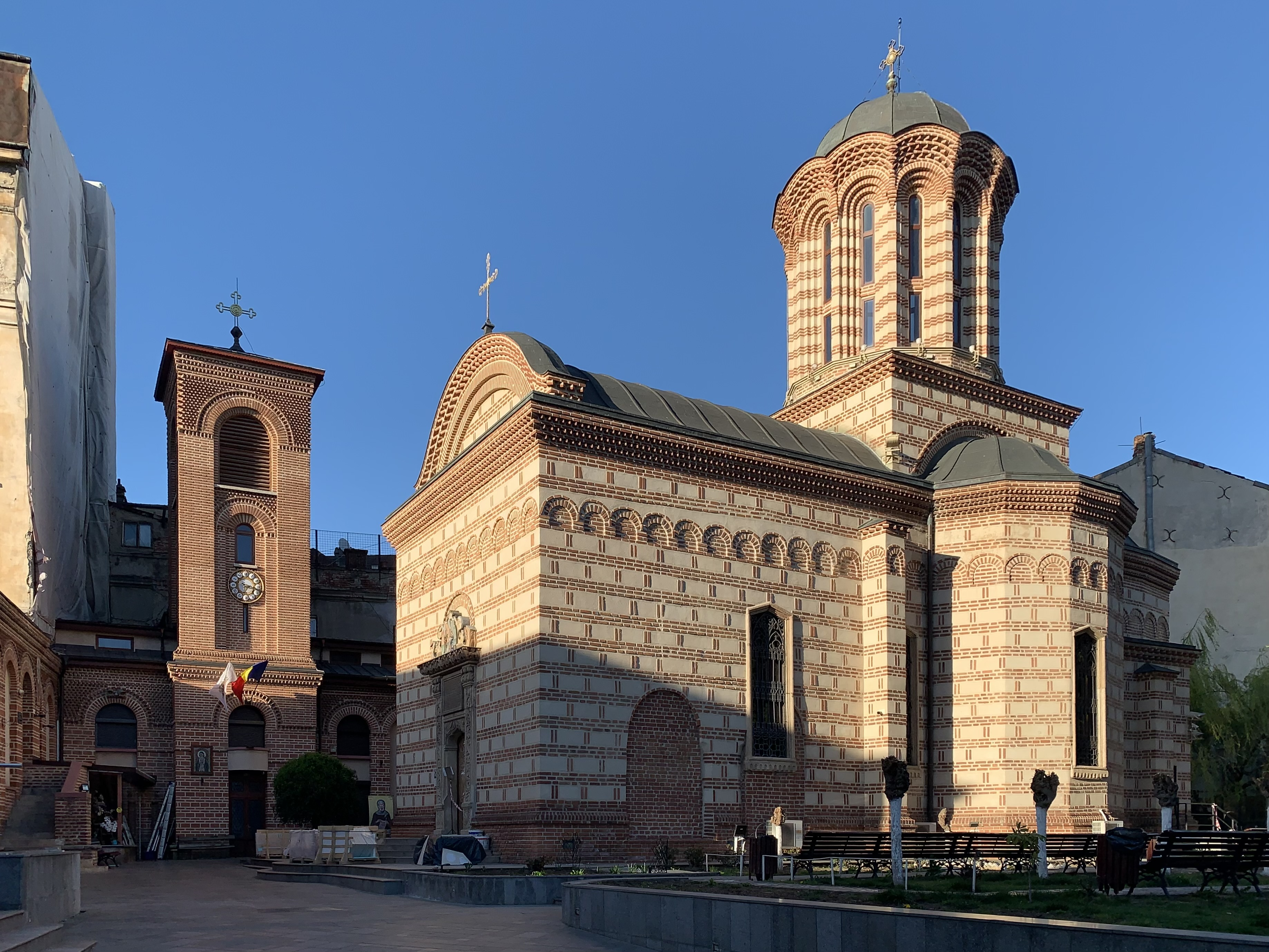
- The exterior of the church and its bell tower in 2023

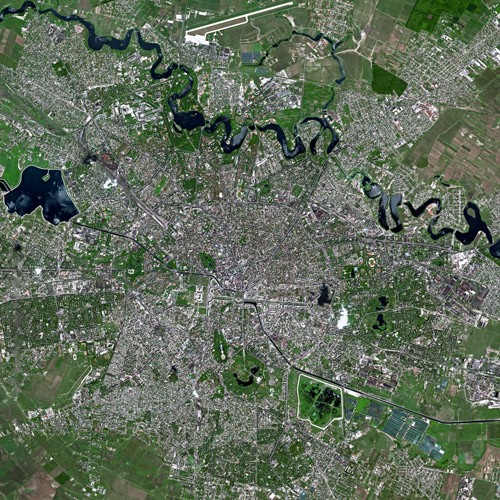
- Location within Bucharest, Romania

Religion
- Affiliation: Romanian Orthodox Church

Location
- Location: Lipscani, Bucharest
- Country: Romania
- Interactive map of Curtea Veche Church
- Coordinates: 44°25′01″N 26°06′04″E

Architecture
- Style: Brâncovenesc

Specifications
- Length: 25 m
- Width: 14 m

Website
- Official website

The Curtea Veche Church (Romanian: Biserica Curtea Veche) is a Romanian Orthodox church located at 33 Franceză Street in the Lipscani quarter of Bucharest, Romania. It is dedicated to the Feast of the Annunciation and to Saint Anthony the Great.

== History ==
=== Founding and early period ===
The oldest church in Bucharest, it is the only one of four churches that initially existed within Curtea Veche, the court of the Princes of Wallachia; many princes of the 16th through 18th centuries prayed there or were anointed to their office. The date of construction is not entirely clear: the 1715 pisanie placed above the entrance door by Ștefan Cantacuzino, replacing one from the 16th century, mentions Mircea the Shepherd (buried there in 1559) as the builder, with his son Pătrașcu the Good responsible for ornamentation and painting. The oldest document mentioning the building is from 1563. The donor portrait depicts Mircea the Shepherd, his wife Doamna Chiajna, their son Mircea and Mircea the Elder, who founded a church there during his much earlier reign. The church and court were burned a number of times by the Ottomans. A bell tower was built in the 1670s under Grigore I Ghica and George Ducas; it burned following a lightning strike in 1691 and was rebuilt by Constantin Brâncoveanu, who added a clock.

Ștefan Cantacuzino replaced the entrance portal with a wider one, still extant; tore down the wall separating nave from narthex, replacing it with three arches on stone columns; painted the interior; and redesigned the facades, coating them in carefully worked white mortar designed to imitate building blocks. A 1758 document indicates that Constantine Mavrocordatos enlarged the building by adding two chapels to the north and south of the narthex, up to the apse windows; these appear on a 1799 plan. There were thus three altars, with access through holes in the wall; the main altar was also enlarged. In 1798, upon orders from Constantine Hangerli, the surrounding land and buildings were sold at auction, with the funds going to Curtea Nouă. The old church entered a period of decline, with merchant houses built from the ruins of the court cropping up.

=== Transformation, restoration and description ===
The Great Fire of Bucharest in 1847 partly destroyed the church; all surrounding buildings were then demolished. The nearby jail and its chapel were destroyed; as the latter was not rebuilt, its patron saint, Anthony, was transferred to Curtea Veche Church. Work to repair the latter began immediately, and again from 1849, when an Austrian architect brought in a Gothic Revival style to the exterior: the spire was redone, a small portico was added, the side chapels were removed and the windows enlarged. In 1852, Constantin Lecca repainted the interior frescoes, destroyed by fire. Fragments of the 1715 painting survive in the altar and in the niches at the sides of the entrance. The furniture was redone, including a new carved and gilt iconostasis. The church was re-sanctified in 1852. The one-story building with a bell tower on top, located in front of the church, dates to the same period.

A first restoration began in 1914: the dome was rebuilt and the roof redone in brass. Work was interrupted by the outbreak of World War I. A new restoration, between 1928 and 1935, sought to restore the church to its original appearance. The thick layer of plaster was removed, revealing the 16th-century exterior, with its complex brick pattern. The base and cornice were emphasized by adding a special type of brick. The upper area is emphasized by a frieze of small niches. On the north and south facades, one can see the walled-up holes that led to the side chapels. Only the windows, with an angled upper part, remain from the 19th-century modifications. The interior arches were removed, their site marked by stone on the floor, while the ktetor’s grave was given a marble frame. The dome was enhanced, given twelve arched windows. The altar was redone in triangular form; the bell tower and parish house were rebuilt. Archaeological excavations took place in 1953. The church was consolidated after the 1977 earthquake, the painting restored, a garden added. It was again sanctified in 1983.

The cross-shaped church measures 25 meters long by 9–14 meters wide, with no portico, a fine stone portal and a small rounded pediment above the entablature. The nave and narthex feature a vaulted ceiling, reflected on the exterior in the curved tin roof. The Pantocrator dome rises above the nave; its semi-spherical roof mirrors the window arches. The church is listed as a historic monument by Romania's Ministry of Culture and Religious Affairs; the parish house is also listed.
