= Petru Cercel =

Petru II Cercel
- Voivode of Wallachia
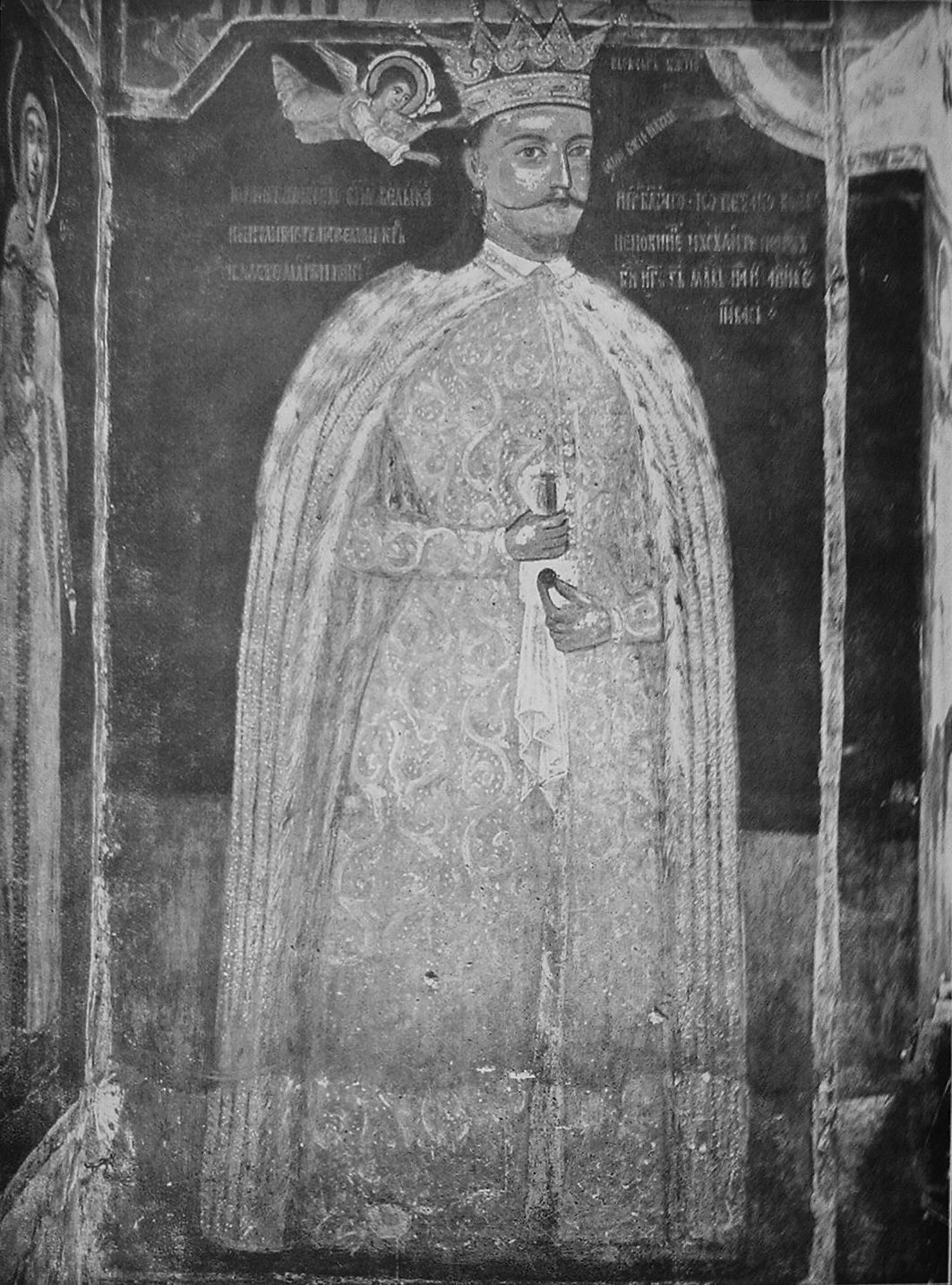
- Petru Cercel at the Căluiu Monastery

Voivode of Wallachia
- Reign: 29 August 1583 – 16 April 1585
- Predecessor: Mihnea Turcitul
- Successor: Mihnea Turcitul
- Died: March 1590
- House: Drăculești
- Father: Pătrașcu cel Bun

Petru II Cercel (Peter Earring or Earring Peter; c. 1545 – March 1590) was a Voivode (Prince) of Wallachia from 1583 to 1585, legitimate son to Pătrașcu cel Bun and alleged half-brother of Mihai Viteazul. A polyglot and a minor figure as a poet, Petru is noted for having written his verses in Tuscan.

== In Europe ==
Petru spent his early years constantly travelling, trying to win support in his bid for the Wallachian throne. The fact that, as of 1579, he received unconditional support in France, coupled with the jewellery-wearing that attracted his moniker have led to speculations that Cercel belonged to the group of mignons of Henry III. It is even stated that Henry interceded with the Porte to award Petru the crown because of his affection for him.

Petru travelled to Istanbul in 1581, as constant backing by the French ambassador had influenced the Porte to look into matters; he arrived there in May, after being welcomed and spending time in Venice and Ragusa. His stay in the Ottoman capital was marked by a competition in bribing and intrigue, carried out against Ecaterina Salvaresso, mother to the child-voivode Mihnea (who was to be known as Mihnea Turcitul). Petru was to emerge the winner, with Mihnea and Ecaterina heading for a brief exile in Tripoli.

== Reign ==
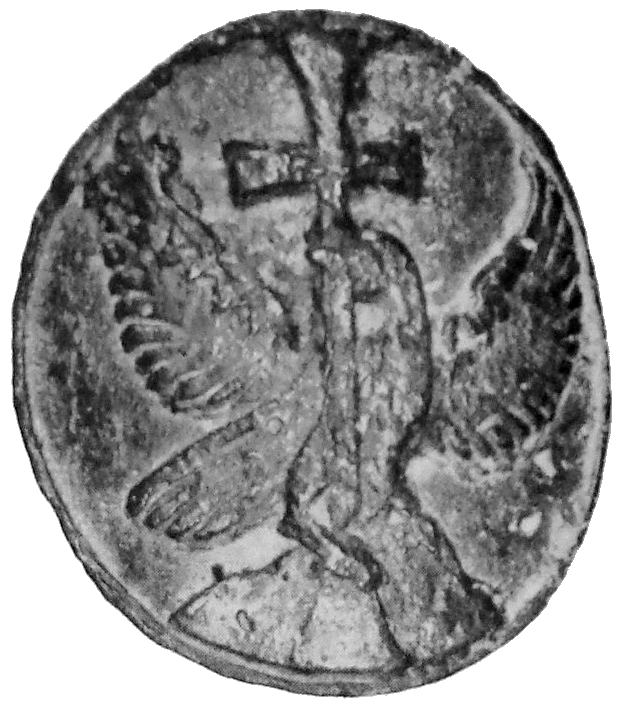
Coat of arms of Petru Cercel

After a short stay in Adrianopole, the new Prince entered Bucharest on 19 August 1583, accompanied by a retinue of foreigners. Apparently, he aimed to replace some of the boyars with his own protegees: he ordered the killings of several Sfat members. At the same time, Petru increased taxes – this was motivated not only by his own large debt, but also by the fact that the throne was awarded to him on the condition not to cease payments owed by Mihnea (as Petru had waited to be awarded the throne, all debts had accumulated interest); on the side, the Prince also amassed a large personal fortune – more than half a million scudi by 1583.

He expanded and improved the Court in Târgoviște (largely ruined today), notably by adding (1584) the Casa Domnească (Princely House), a Renaissance-inspired small palace, by building a new wall and Princely church, and by introducing plumbing. Petru Cercel established a bronze cannon foundry in the city.

== Downfall ==
The maneuvers of Mihnea and the hostility of certain Turkish beys attracted Petru Cercel's fall from grace. He managed to gather his fortune and flee the country on 6 April 1585, avoiding being taken into custody by the Ottoman kapucu. He arrived in Transylvania only to be arrested in Mediaș on Sigismund Báthory's orders after being deserted by his men. His belongings were confiscated and he was sent to prison in Maramureș.

In 1587, Petru managed to escape by sliding down a rope out the open window. He travelled to Warsaw and then to Vienna, reaching Rome (where he enlisted Pope Gregory XIV's support for his cause); Henry III reassured him of his protection, and Petru headed for Istanbul – arriving in the city in July 1589. He tried to profit from Mihnea's second fall from grace (and exile), but he proved to be a feeble opponent: as Mihnea regained the throne, Petru was imprisoned at Yedikule. Mihnea advanced large sums to have him killed by the Ottomans, in order to eliminate the threat. In March 1590, Petru Cercel was embarked on a ship, under the pretext of sailing to exile in Rhodes, and was decapitated on the spot.

== Note ==
All dates are given in New Style format (see Adoption of the Gregorian calendar#Adoption in Eastern Europe).

Petru Cercel House of Drăculești Died: 1590
Regnal titles
Preceded by Mihnea Turcitul	Voivode of Wallachia; 1583–1585	Succeeded by Mihnea Turcitul
