= Radu Ilie Haidăul =

Prince of Wallachia

Prince of Wallachia
- Reign: 15 November 1552 – May 1553
- Predecessor: Mircea the Shepherd
- Successor: Mircea the Shepherd
- Born: unknown
- Died: 28 July 1558; Istanbul
- House: House of Drăculești
- Father: Radu of Afumați
- Religion: Orthodox

Radu Ilie Haidăul (? – 1558) was the son of Radu of Afumați and ruler of Wallachia from November 15, 1552, to May 1553.

The nickname "Haidăul" means hajduk, because having the backing of the Habsburgs in taking over Wallachia, he led an army of mercenaries (known in the Balkan region and the Romanian principalities as "hajduks"), made up of Hungarians and Poles, as well as anti-Ottoman boyars that sought refuge in Transylvania (the latter were hunted down by prince Mircea the Shepherd).

Living in exile in 1551, the Habsburgs turned to him to rule Wallachia as a leader devoted to their cause. Backed by Habsburg general Johann Baptist Castaldo, he invaded Wallachia in 1552, and, on November 16, defeated the ruler of Wallachia, Mircea the Shepherd. He won the Battle of Mănești (today, in Prahova County) on November 15, 1552, and Mircea the Shepherd fled to Giurgiu. Radu Ilie assumed the throne and would rule Wallachia until May 11, 1553, when Mircea the Shepherd retook the throne. He drowned in 1558, in the Marmara Sea.
