= House of Drăculești =

Wallachian noble family

Drăculești
- Princely noble family
- Parent family: House of Basarab
- Country: Wallachia
- Etymology: Dracul ("Dragon")
- Founded: 1390
- Founder: Vlad the Dragon
- Final ruler: Alexandru Coconul or Mihnea III Radu
- Titles: Voivode of Wallachia, Voivode of Moldavia
- Distinctions: Order of the Dragon
- Traditions: Romanian Eastern Orthodoxy
- Dissolution: As early as 1632, as late as the 18th century
- Cadet branches: Movilești

The House of Drăculești (Romanian: [drəkuˈleʃtʲ]) were one of two major rival lines of Wallachian voivodes of the House of Basarab, the other being the House of Dănești. These lines were in constant contest for the throne from the late fourteenth to the early sixteenth centuries. Descendants of the line of Drăculești would eventually come to dominate the principality, until its common rule with Transylvania and Moldavia by Mihai Viteazul in 1600.

== Etymology ==
The line of the Drăculești began with Vlad II Dracul ("the Dragon"), son of one of the most important rulers of the Basarab dynasty, Mircea the Elder. The name Drăculești is the patronymic of Dracul, which according to most historians is derived from the 1431 membership of Vlad II in the Order of the Dragon (Societas draconistarum) that had been founded in 1408 AD by Holy Roman Emperor Sigismund. Another proposal holds that Vlad II earned the nickname "Dracul" (at the time also meaning "Devil") by Romanians, who associated the dragon imagery on the Order's insignia with a demon. The Order's purpose was to defend the Hungarian royal house, where Sigismund ruled, as well as the Catholic Church. It created a strong solidarity among central and southeastern Europe's Christians, in their fight against Ottoman and Tartar (from the Golden Horde and Crimean Khanate) Muslims. Vlad II's son became known as Vlad Dracula (Drăculea) which meant "son of the Dragon", i.e. of Dracul.

== Members of the Drăculești line ==
Members of the Drăculești line who held the throne of Wallachia include the following:

Ruler	Remark
Vlad II, the Dragon	1436–1442, 1443–1447; son of Mircea the Elder
Mircea II	1442; son of Vlad II
Vlad III, Drăculea	1448, 1456–1462, 1476; son of Vlad II
Radu III, the Handsome	1462–1473, 1474; son of Vlad II
Vlad IV, the Monk	1481, 1482–1495; son of Vlad II
Radu IV, the Great	1495–1508; son of Vlad the Monk
Mihnea the Wrongdoer	1508–1509; son of Vlad III
Mircea III, the Dragon	1510; son of Mihnea the Wrongdoer
Vlad V, the Younger	1510–1512; son of Vlad the Monk
Vlad VI (Dragomir the Monk)	1521; son of Vlad the Younger
Radu from Afumați	1522–1523, 1524, 1524–1525, 1525–1529; son of Radu the Great
Radu VI Bădica	1523–1524; son of Radu the Great
Vlad VII, the Drowned	1530–1532; son of Vlad the Younger
Vlad VIII Vintilă from Slatina	1532–1534, 1534–1535; son of Radu the Great
Radu VII Paisie	1534, 1535–1545; son of Radu the Great
Mircea V, the Shepherd	1545–1552, 1553–1554, 1558–1559; son of Radu the Great
Radu VIII Ilie, the Hajduk	1552–1553; son of Radu from Afumați
Pătrașcu the Good	1554–1558; son of Radu Paisie
Petru the Younger	1559–1568; son of Mircea the Shepherd
Alexandru II Mircea	1568–1574, 1574–1577; son of Mircea III, the Dragon
Vintilă of Wallachia	1574; son of Pătrașcu the Good
Mihnea II, the Turned-Turk	1577–1583, 1585–1591; son of Alexandru Mircea
Petru II, Earring	1583–1585; son of Pătrașcu the Good
Mihai II, the Brave	1593–1601; son of Pătrașcu the Good
Nicolae II Pătrașcu	1599–1601; son of Mihai the Brave and co-ruler/ heir
Radu IX Mihnea	1601–1602, 1611, 1611–1616, 1620–1623; son of Mihai the Brave
Alexandru V, the Little Prince	1623–1627; son of Radu Mihnea, the last of Vlad the Impaler's Romanian bloodline
Mihnea III Radu	1658–1659

Trașcă Drăculescu – Wallachian boyar, inhabitant of Oltenia, the "last legitimate" descendant of the dynasty, who died in the 18th century.

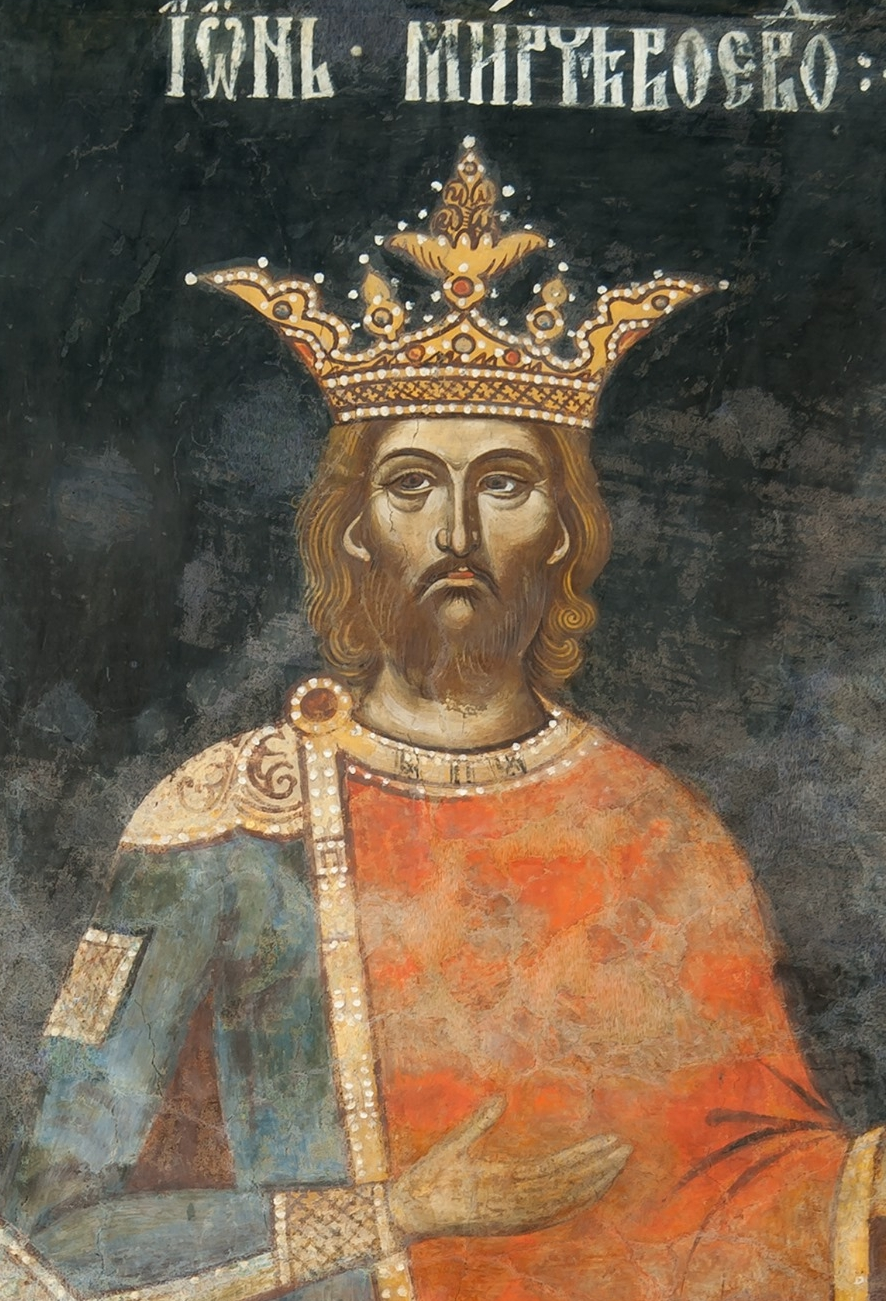
Mircea the Elder

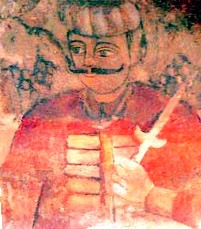
Vlad Dracul

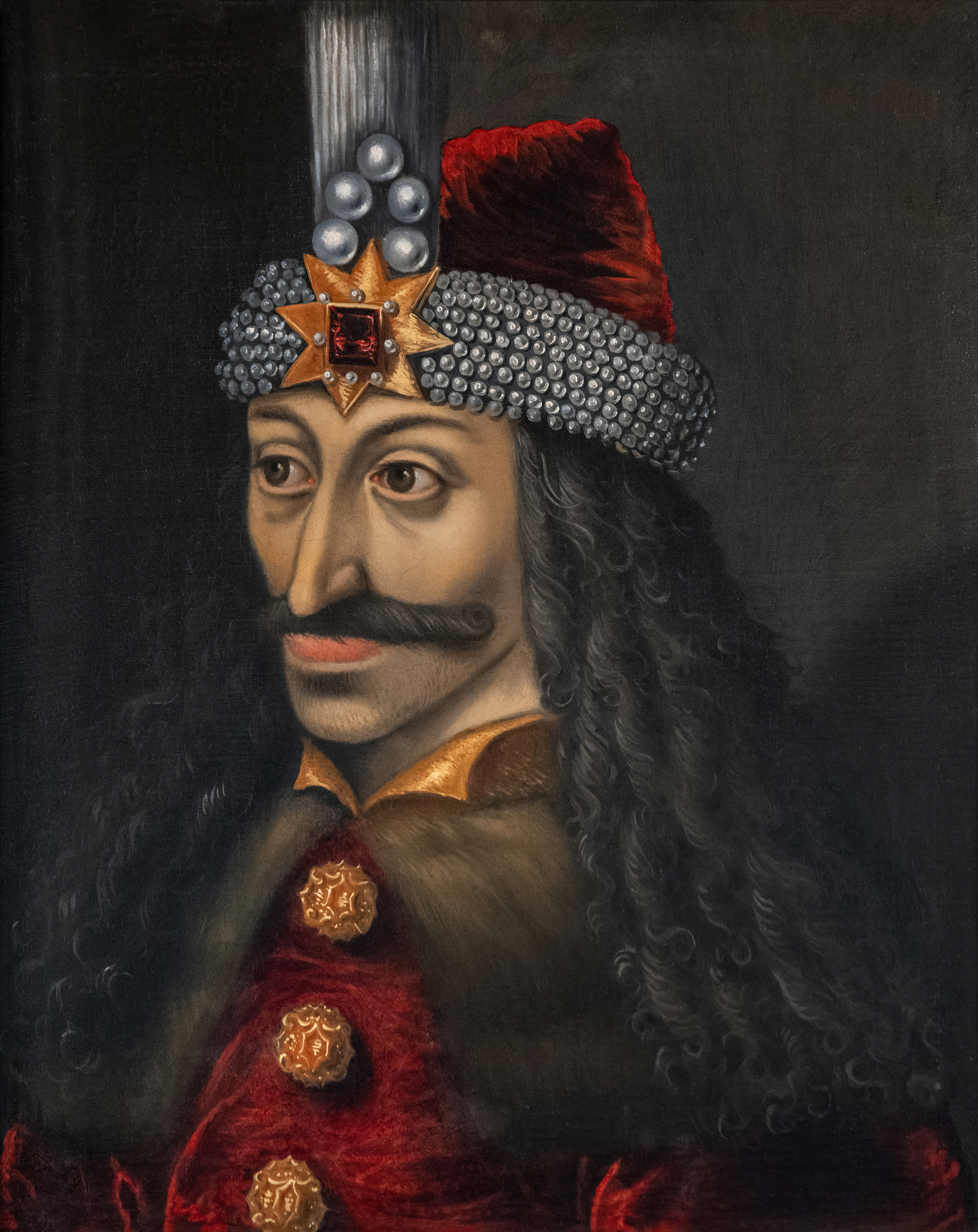
Vlad III, the Impaler

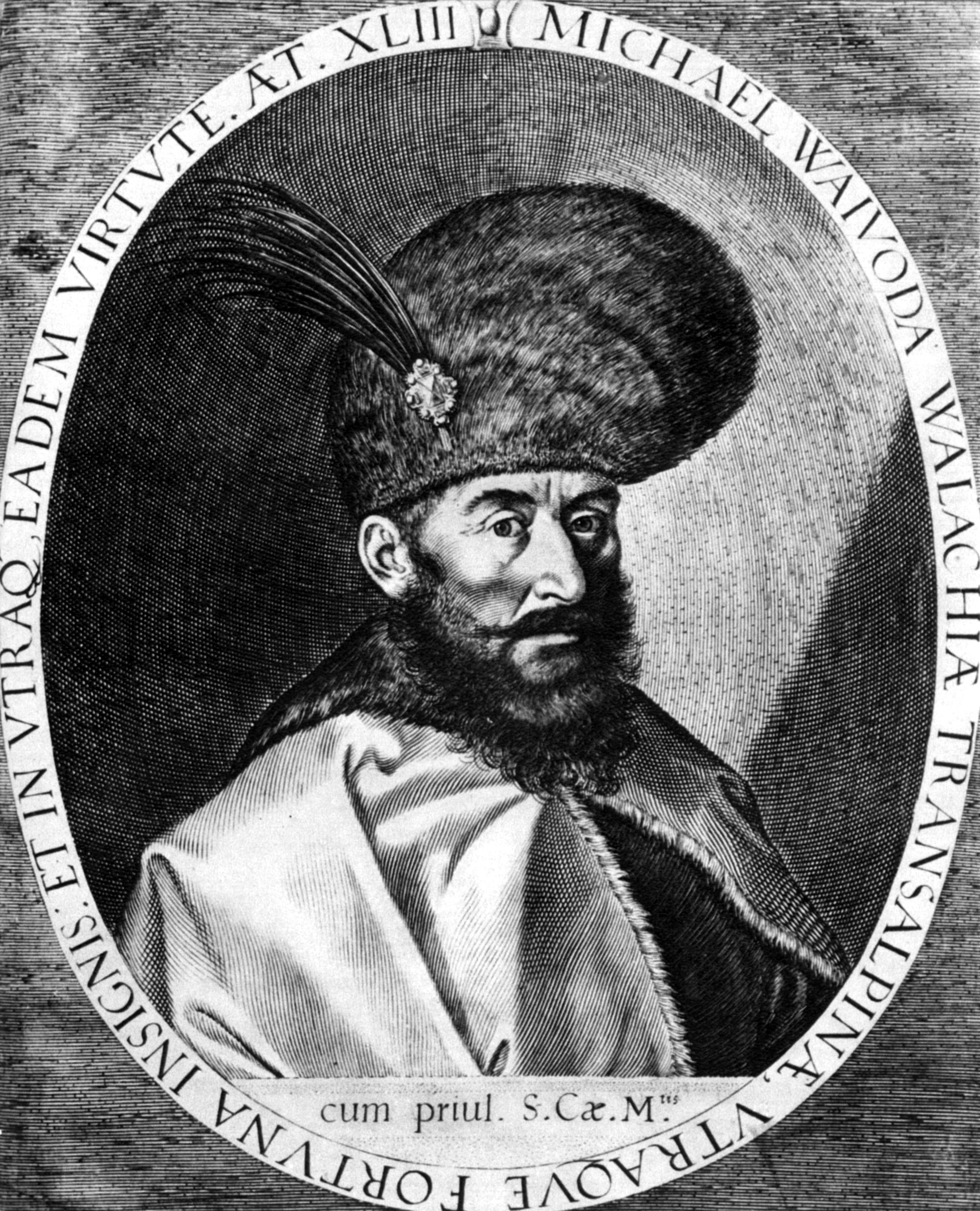
Michael the Brave

== See also ==
- List of rulers of Wallachia

== Sources ==
- Cazacu, Matei (2017). Dracula. Brill. ISBN 9789004349216.
- Giurescu, Constantin (1976). Istoria românilor. Vol. II. București: Editura științifică și enciclopedică.
- Grumeza, Ion (2010). The Roots of Balkanization: Eastern Europe C.E. 500-1500. University Press of America. ISBN 9780761851349.
- Fine, John V. A. Jr. (1994) [1987]. The Late Medieval Balkans: A Critical Survey from the Late Twelfth Century to the Ottoman Conquest. Ann Arbor, Michigan: University of Michigan Press. ISBN 978-0-472-10079-8. OCLC 749133662.
- Jefferson, John (2012). The Holy Wars of King Wladislas and Sultan Murad; The Ottoman-Christian Conflict from 1438-1444. Brill. ISBN 9789004219045.
- Lupașc, Vasile (2008). Răstignit între cruci [Crucified between crosses] (in Romanian). Vol. I. Cetatea de scaun Publishing house.
- Treptow, Kurt W. (2000). Vlad III Dracula: The Life and Times of the Historical Dracula. The Center of Romanian Studies. ISBN 9789739839228.
