= Doamna Chiajna =

Princess consort of Wallachia (1525–1588)

Doamna Chiajna of Moldavia
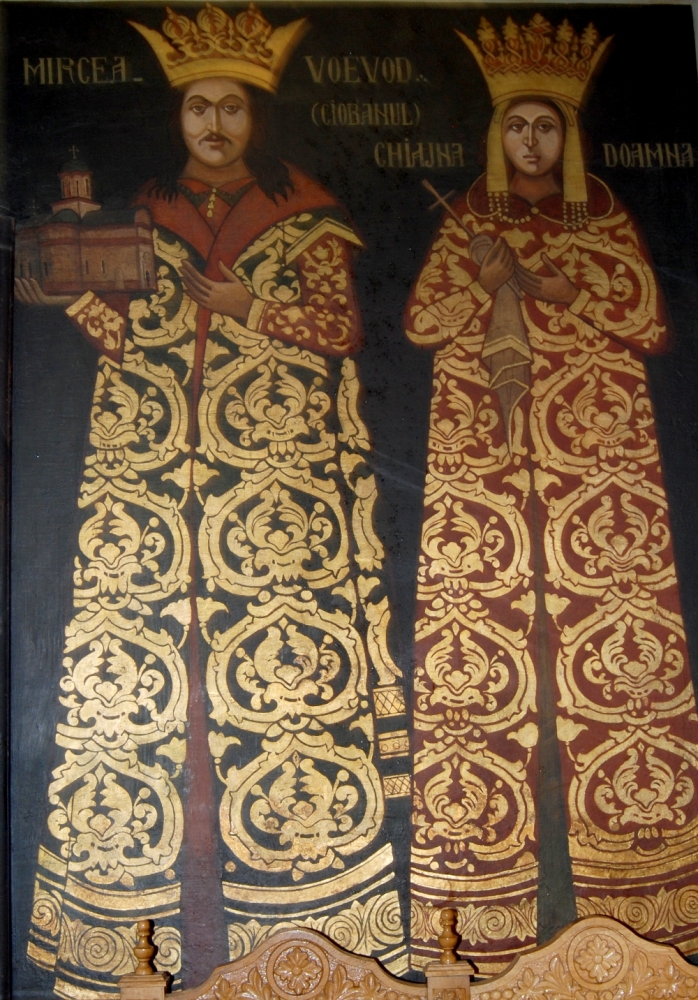

Regent of Wallachia
- Regency: 1559–1564
- Voivode: Peter the Younger

Princess Consort of Wallachia (1st reign)
- Tenure: 1545–1552

Princess Consort of Wallachia (2nd reign)
- Tenure: 1553–1554

Princess Consort of Wallachia (3rd reign)
- Tenure: 1558–1559
- Born: 1525; Poland
- Died: 1588 (aged 62–63)
- Spouse: Mircea the Shepherd
- Issue: Peter the Younger; Radu; Mircea; Stanca of Wallachia; Anca of Wallachia; Marina of Wallachia; Dobra of Wallachia
- House: House of Mușat (by birth); House of Drăculești (by marriage)
- Father: Peter IV Rareș of Moldavia
- Mother: Doamna Elena Ecaterina Rareș

Doamna Chiajna (1525–1588) was a Princess consort of Wallachia. She was married to Mircea the Shepherd. She was regent in Wallachia from 1559 to 1575.

== Life ==
She was born as in Poland, the daughter of prince Peter IV Rareș and Elena Ecaterina Rareș ( the daughter of Jovan Branković), and married prince Mircea the Shepherd in 1545. She founded the first school in Romania, at Câmpulung, in 1552.

Mircea was defeated in battle by Radu Ilie at Mănești on November 16, 1552. Chiajna, Mircea, and their children were forced to flee, seeking succour with family in Giurgiu. Mircea returned to the throne the next year.

Chiajna and Mircea had seven children, including Peter the Younger.

After the death of her spouse in 1559, she became regent in Wallachia on behalf of her son, Peter the Younger. She is described as an energetic, intelligent and gifted politician, who fiercely defended her son's throne. Legend holds that in 1575 she was abducted by the Ottomans and deported to Aleppo in Syria.

Last sourced report on 1588 and her resting place whereabouts remained unclear.
