= Catherine Salvaresso =

Princess consort of Wallachia

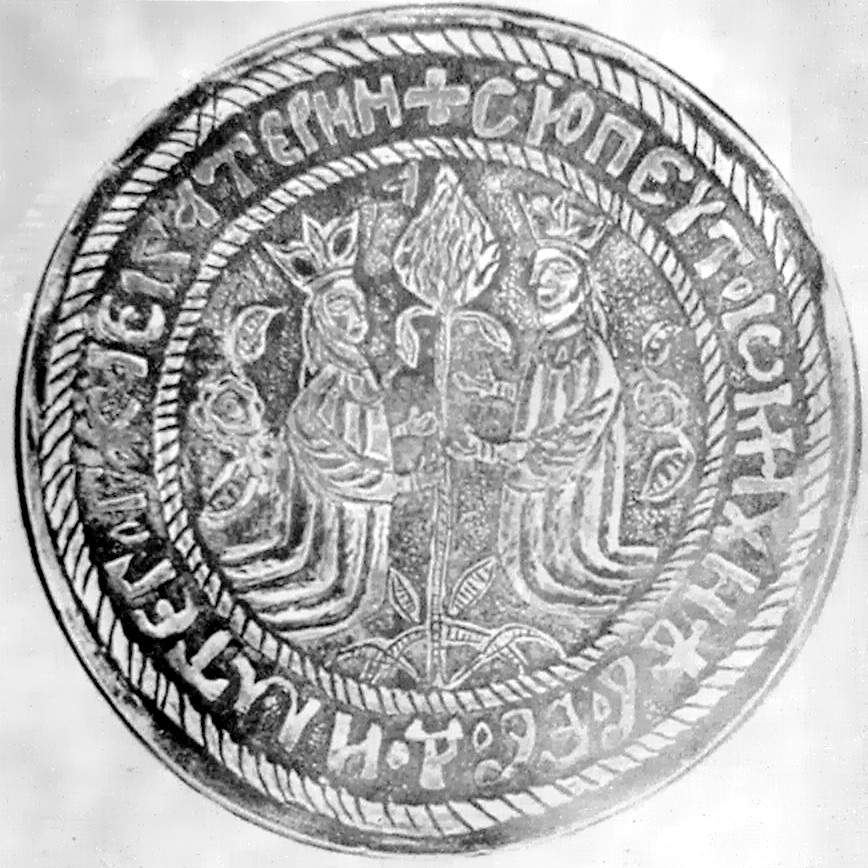

Princess consort of Wallacia
- Tenure: June 1568 – April 1574; May 1574 – 11 September 1577 (second tenure)

Regent of Wallachia
- Tenure: 11 September 1577 - July 1583
- Died: 1590; Tripoli
- Spouse: Alexandru II Mircea
- Issue: Mihnea Turcitul

Catherine Salvaresso, or Ecaterina Salvaresso (died 1590 in Tripoli) was a princess consort of Wallachia. She was married to Alexandru II Mircea and was the mother of Mihnea Turcitul. She was the regent of Wallachia during the minority of her son from 1577 until 1583.

Salvaresso was the daughter of an Italian father and a Greek mother. She was a resident of the Italian quarter in Constantinople, where she met Alexandru II Mircea during his pilgrimage. They married in Pera in 1558, and she converted to the Orthodox faith. She founded the convent Slătioarele and imported to first printing press in Bucharest in 1573. In 1577, her spouse died and she became the regent of her son, who was at that time a hostage of the Ottomans.

== Sources ==
- Ileana Cazan, Eugen Denize: Marile puteri și spațiul românesc în secolele XV-XVI, Editura Universității din București, 2001
- Gh.T. Ionescu: Nou despre doamna Ecaterina Salvaresso a Țării Românești, în Istros, VII, Brăila, 1994, p. 189-199.
