= Alexander II Mircea =

Prince of Wallachia (1529–1577)

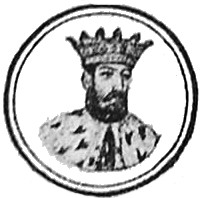

Prince of Wallachia (1st reign)
- Reign: June 1568 – April 1574
- Predecessor: Peter the Younger
- Successor: Vintilă of Wallachia

Prince of Wallachia (2nd reign)
- Reign: May 1574 – 11 September 1577
- Predecessor: Vintilă of Wallachia
- Successor: Mihnea II Turcitul
- Born: 3 March 1529; Transylvania
- Died: 11 September 1577 (aged 48); Bucharest
- Spouse: Catherine Salvaresso
- Issue: Mihnea II Turcitul
- Dynasty: Drăculeşti
- Father: Mircea III Dracul
- Mother: Maria Despina
- Religion: Orthodox

Alexandru II Mircea (3 March 1529 – 11 September 1577) was a Voivode or Prince of Wallachia from 1568 to 1574 and 1574 to 1577. He was the father of Mihnea II Turcitul. His parents were Mircea III Dracul and Maria Despina. Raised by the Turks in Istanbul, he hardly knew his country of origin before gaining the throne of Wallachia.

== Rule ==
Alexandru and his wife Catherine Salvaresso came to Bucharest in June 1574. Like his great-grandfather Vlad III Dracula, he was known for cruelty, by slaughtering dissident boyars. Eventually, Alexandru was poisoned by noblemen claiming to be loyal to him. In 1574 he helped his brother Peter the Lame in taking the throne of Moldavia.

Alexander II Mircea House of Drăculeşti Died: 1577
Regnal titles
Preceded by Petru cel Tânăr	Voivode of Wallachia; 1568-1574	Succeeded by Vintilă of Wallachia
Preceded by Vintilă of Wallachia	Voivode of Wallachia; 1574-1577	Succeeded by Catherine Salvaresso regent for Mihnea Turcitul
