= Andronache =

Andronache is a Romanian surname. Notable people with the surname include:

- Luca Andronache (born 2003), Romanian footballer
- Vergil Andronache (born 1970), Romanian football manager and former player
