= Mircea the Shepherd =

Mircea al V-lea Ciobanul
- Voivode of Wallachia
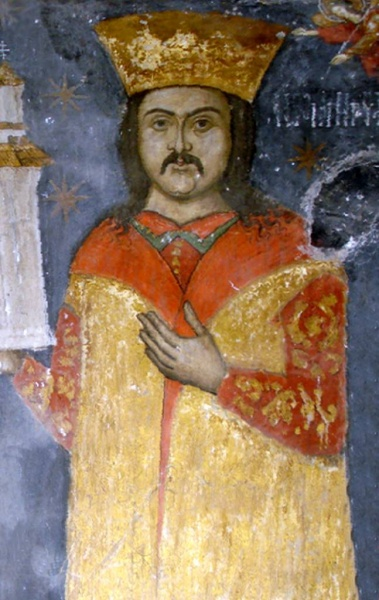

Voivode of Wallachia (1st reign)
- Reign: January 1545 – 16 November 1552
- Predecessor: Radu VII Paisie
- Successor: Radu Ilie Haidăul

Voivode of Wallachia (2nd reign)
- Reign: May 1553 – 28 February 1554
- Predecessor: Radu Ilie Haidăul
- Successor: Pătrașcu the Good

Voivode of Wallachia (3rd reign)
- Reign: January 1558 – 21 September 1559
- Predecessor: Pătrașcu the Good
- Successor: Peter the Younger
- Died: 25 September 1559; Principality of Wallachia
- Burial: Curtea Veche Church, Bucharest
- Spouse: Doamna Chiajna
- Issue: Peter the Younger; Radu; Mircea; Stanca of Wallachia; Anca of Wallachia; Marina of Wallachia
- House: House of Drăculești
- Father: Radu IV the Great
- Mother: Doamna Catalina Crnojević of Zeta
- Religion: Eastern Orthodox Church

Mircea the Shepherd (Romanian: Mircea Ciobanul; died 25 September 1559) was the Voivode (or Prince) of Wallachia three times: January 1545 (he entered Bucharest on 17 March)–16 November 1552; May 1553–28 February 1554 (leaving Bucharest that March); and January 1558–21 September 1559.

== Early life ==
He was the fifth son of Radu cel Mare. His baptismal name was Dumitru and he married Chiajna, the daughter of Petru Rareș, whose name was in fact Ana. He was probably called the Shepherd because he bought sheep for the Istanbul markets before ascending the throne.

== Career ==
The Ottoman Empire (Wallachia's suzerain) named him ruler in January 1545 in place of his stepbrother Radu Paisie and he entered Bucharest on 17 March 1545, ascending the throne on that day. Through his first decree of privilege, of 25 March 1545, he maintained in their functions and even promoted four high officials of his predecessor. A chronicle relates that two weeks after his installation, he ordered that a number of boyars be killed, including Coadă the vornic (internal affairs minister), Radul the comis, Stroe the spătar (second-in-command of the military), and Vintilă, also a comis. The chronicle also mentions that they were tortured so that they would reveal where the money and jewels were hidden, so that these could be poured into the treasury. Following this massacre, some of the wealthiest boyars and the relatives of those killed went into exile in Transylvania and Hungary, where they came together and tried twice to depose him from the throne.

== First challenge ==
The first attempt came at the Battle of Periș, on 24 August 1546, when the host of boyars in exile was attacked by surprise and decimated by Mircea the Shepherd. At the beginning of 1548 a new exodus of the boyars remaining in Wallachia took place, headed by Stoica the stolnic, Vintilă the vornic, Radu the great logofăt and Pârvu the postelnic. In these conditions the boyars in exile regrouped and a second confrontation took place that year. Led by a young pretender and accompanied by 1,000 Székely mercenaries, they entered Wallachia hoping to be backed by a popular revolt. However, the expected revolt never materialized; the chronicle of the Brașov resident Ostermayer seems to indicate that the peasants backed Mircea. It appears that the battle took place near the village of Miloste ( in present the village of Milostea) in Vâlcea County, with Mircea the Shepherd emerging victorious and the boyars who were not killed escaping with great difficulty.

== Second challenge ==
While the Habsburgs who occupied Transylvania in 1551 wanted a ruler devoted to their cause in Wallachia, the new governor of Transylvania, Imperial general Johann Baptist Castaldo, backed Radu Ilie, who, also surrounded by boyars in exile, crossed the border into Wallachia in November 1552. While Radu Ilie had about 15,000 men, Mircea the Shepherd had around eight or nine thousand. Two days before the battle, fearful of being betrayed, Mircea had 47 boyars put to death at his table. The decisive battle took place at Mănești on 16 November 1552. Radu Ilie was victorious, while Mircea took refuge with his family in Giurgiu.

== Loss and reinstatement ==
On 11 May 1553, Mircea the Shepherd, backed in person by the prince of Moldavia, Alexandru Lăpușneanu, retook his throne after successful defeating Radu and the Habsburgs. His second period of rule was short, as the very same Alexandru Lăpușneanu, suspecting him of bad faith, sent his high vornic, Nădăbaico, to remove Mircea from the throne. Then, he obtained from the Ottoman Porte the right to rule for Pătrașcu, while Mircea had to leave for Istanbul.

After Pătrașcu died in January 1558, Sultan Suleiman the Magnificent once again granted Mircea the Shepherd the right to rule. His appointment provoked an exodus of boyars across the Southern Carpathians and out of Wallachia. Mircea promised these men that if they returned and paid homage to him, he would forgive them. He received them at the princely court in Bucharest, in the presence of Ottoman dignitaries. Nevertheless, after the Ottomans had left, Mircea killed the boyars, Stănilă the vornic being the most important of these. That same day, 3 February 1558, was the first time that representatives of the Orthodox clergy also perished.

== Death ==
Mircea the Shepherd died in 1559, being buried in the Curtea Veche Church in Bucharest, which he had rebuilt. After his death, his wife, Doamna Chiajna, helped their son Petru to obtain the throne.

== See also ==
- History of Bucharest

Mircea the Shepherd House of Drăculești Died: 1559
Regnal titles
Preceded by Radu Paisie	Voivode of Wallachia; 1545–1552	Succeeded by Radu Ilie
Preceded by Radu Ilie	Voivode of Wallachia; 1553–1554	Succeeded by Pătrașcu cel Bun
Preceded by Pătrașcu cel Bun	Voivode of Wallachia; 1558–1559	Succeeded by Petru cel Tânăr
