= Pătrașcu the Good =

- Voivode of Wallachia
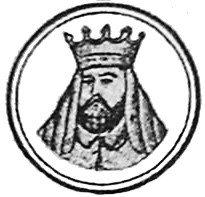
- 19th Century Image

Voivode of Wallachia
- Reign: March 1554 – 24 December 1557
- Predecessor: Mircea the Shepherd
- Successor: Mircea the Shepherd
- Born: unknown
- Died: 24 December 1557
- Burial: Dealu Monastery
- Wives: Zamfira; Rada
- Issue: (allegedly): Petru Cercel; Michael the Brave
- House: Drăculeşti
- Dynasty: Basarab
- Father: Radu Paisie

Pătrașcu the Good (Romanian: Pătrașcu cel Bun), (? – 24 December 1557) was a ruler of the principality of Wallachia, between 1554 and 24 December 1557, one of many rulers of Wallachia during the 16th century. A member of the House of Drăculești, he was the son of Radu Paisie.

== Reign ==
At the Porte's command, he goes with his army in Transylvania (1556) to restore John Sigismund who, together with his mother, Queen Isabella, had to withdraw to Poland. 14,000 soldiers flee the Carpathians, one in May, the other in July, and the great saint Socol brings the queen from Lvov. On 28 October, Pătraşcu himself was in Cluj, satisfied with the result - (to which Mr. Moldovan, Alexandru Lăpuşneanu). As silence was not yet fully restored, a new action was needed in Transylvania. Patrascu could not accompany the armies: he was ill - he was in May at Ramnic, for the air, and a doctor sent by Sibiu. On 24 of December 1557 he died. Some say that the voivode would have been poisoned even by the great governor Socol who wanted to become a ruler: that was not proven. However, it is certain that Socol, when Mircea the Shepherd returned, retreat with his son, Radu stolnic to Transylvania and took with him the coffers of the deceased: 400, 00 ducats. (Later, he promised 14,000 ducats to the Ambassador of France in Istanbul, only not be surrendered to Turks and then, killed). He governed in 1545-1557.

== Family ==
His wife was named Voica, a descendant of the boyars from Slătioare. They had a daughter Maria (married in February 1555) and three sons: Peter, who was later called 'Cercel'. Some historians consider Petru Cercel, (who ruled Wallachia 1583 to 1588), to have been the son of Pătrașcu. Michael the Brave, who ruled Wallachia 1593–1601, is considered by most historians to have been a son of Pătrașcu, while others believe that he invented his descent in order to justify his rule. The two alleged sons were painted together at an inner wall of a church at Caluiu. According to official chronicles of Mihai Voda, he would have had a postum and illegitimate son Mihai Viteazul, which was denied by newer historiography, starting with Nicolae Iorga.

== Death ==
On 24 December 1557 Pătraşcu died in unclear circumstances in Bucharest. Some historians suggest that the Voivode might have died as a result of poisoning even by the great saint Socol, who had himself thoughts of his own: it is not proven. It is only a matter of fact that Socol, when Mircea Ciobanul returns, takes refuge with his son, Radu stolnic, in Transylvania, taking with him the coffers of the deceased: 400,000 ducats. (Later promises 14,000 ducats to the ambassador of France in Istanbul, only to be taught to the Turks and killed). His domination was between 1545 and 1557. Vintilă installed by the army of John Voda the Brave in 1574 (but only four days) and Petrascu, from Cyprus Pătrașcu was buried at Dealu Monastery.

== Legacy ==
He was called "the Good" by historians because he had a peaceful reign, without any murdering of nobility.

Pătrașcu the Good House of Drăculești Died: 1557
Regnal titles
Preceded by Mircea the Shepherd	Voivode of Wallachia; 1554–1557	Succeeded by Mircea the Shepherd
