= Nicholas Mavrogenes =

Prince of Wallachia (1735–1790)

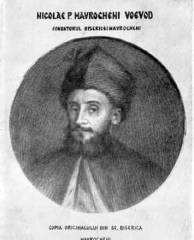

Prince of Wallachia
- Reign: 1786–1789
- Predecessor: Michael Drakos Soutzos
- Successor: Michael Drakos Soutzos
- Born: 1735; Paros, Ottoman Empire
- Died: 30 September 1790 (aged 54–55); Byala, Ottoman Empire
- House: Mavrogenis family
- Religion: Orthodox

Nicholas Mavrogenes (or Mavrogenous; Greek: Νικόλαος Μαυρογένης Nikolaos Mavrogenis (Greek: "Blackbeard"), Romanian: Nicolae Mavrogheni pronounced [nikoˈla.e mavroˈɡeni]), (1735 – 30 September 1790) was a Phanariote Dragoman of the Fleet and de facto governor of the Cyclades islands (1744-1759) and later Prince of Wallachia (reigned 1786–1789). He was the great-uncle of Manto Mavrogenous, a heroine of the Greek War of Independence.

== Early life and election ==
Mavrogenes was born on Paros island to a noble Mavrogheni family, and spoke natively one of the many Greek dialects of the Cyclades (Ienăchiţă Văcărescu later attested that he spoke Greek and Turkish poorly, and that he was not able to learn any Romanian). He lived among the sailors, and was chosen Dragoman of the Fleet to Hasan Pasha, the commander of the Ottoman fleet. Hasan, together with his friend, Grand Vizier Koca Yusuf Pasha, both important figures in the politics of the Ottoman Empire, convinced the Sultan Abdul Hamid I to name Mavrogenes prince of Wallachia on 6 April 1786. He left the Ottoman capital accompanied by a huge and ostentatious retinue.

Unlike other Greek princes of Wallachia chosen by the Sultan, Mavrogenes was not born in Phanar and, as the Greek elites of Constantinople (the Phanariotes) saw this as a decrease in their influence, they tried to bribe Abdul Hamid with 4,000 bags of gold, in order to obtain Yusuf Pasha's ousting from office; nevertheless, the sultan disagreed, and the treasurer of the empire, who had proposed the deal, was arrested, tortured and killed.

== Ruler of Wallachia ==
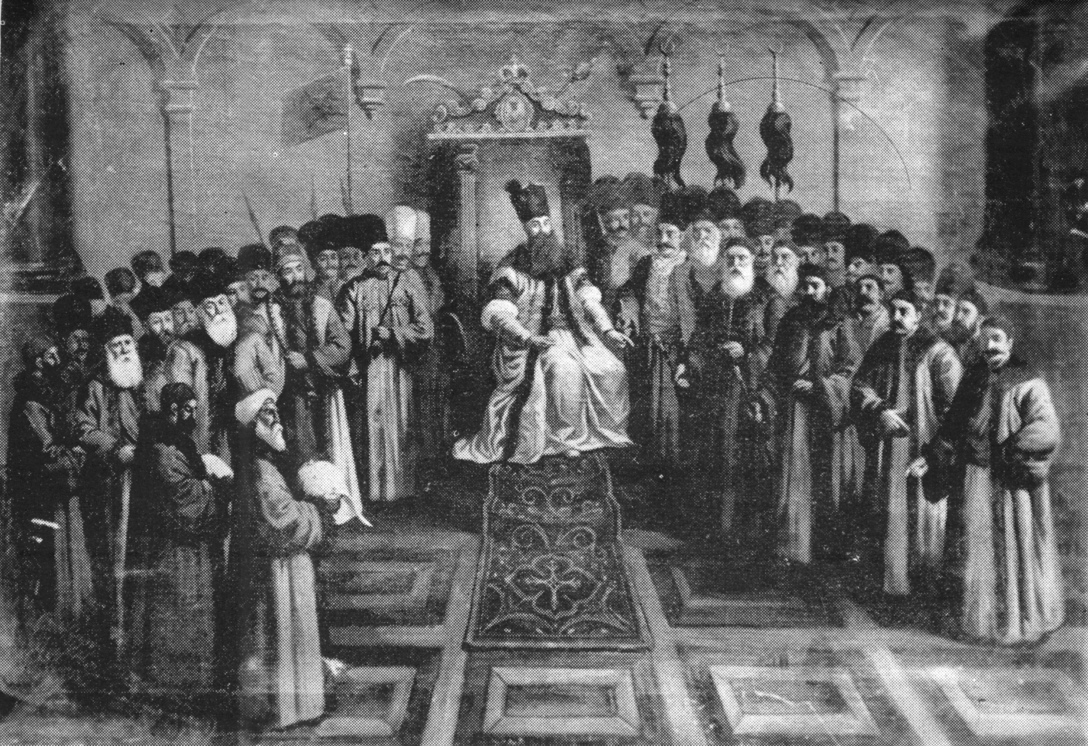
Mavrogenes and the Boyar Council

On 15 May 1786, Mavrogenes reached Văcăreşti, near Bucharest, and on 17 May he was ceremoniously crowned and settled at the princely residence of Curtea Nouă. One of his first decrees was issued four days later, when he announced that all the people of Wallachia could address their grievances directly to him. He even set up a gazebo in Târgul de afară (Obor), so that peasants could speak to him. He also attempted to erect stakes on all major crossroads, to show the people what would happen to them if they engaged in theft or murder, or if they failed to attend church services. During the same year, he ordered the building of an aqueduct, which, although completed, was destroyed during the conflicts that followed his rule, and never fully rebuilt.

Mavrogenes was also involved in the Orthodox Church, decreeing that places of worship were to be permanently open; according to chronicles of the time (Dionisie Eclesiarhul), churches were always full during service, for the duration of his rule — not because of fear of divine punishment, but rather due to fear of the law. Mavrogenes also demanded that Wallachians should lead an austere life and, as such, forbade his people from feasting or lingering in taverns for more than one hour after sunset. On 10 January 1787 he signed a degree which allowed Jews to be tax exempt and gave them a plot of land in mahalaua Popescului neighbourhood of Bucharest for them to build a synagogue (see History of the Jews in Romania).

Mavrogenes often extorted money from the boyars, for which he cited as pretext his recurring dreams, in which he claimed to have been commanded random killings or banishments, effects which he was allowed to avert only if paid a certain sum. In order to mock the boyars, he even gave his horse the rank of clucer and assigned him a bedroom right next to his own, on the second floor of the Court Palace. Mavrogenes awarded those people who paid him enough money boyar ranks and privileges, and even revoked the title for boyars who refused to pay him the amount he demanded. He sometimes staged incognito inspections, to observe the activities of boyar officials.

== In the 1787 War ==
On 24 August 1787 the Ottomans declared war on the Russian Empire and imprisoned the Russian ambassador, Yakov Bulgakov, in the Seven Towers. Mavrogenes replicated the gesture of the Grand Vizier, and arrested Ivan Ivanovich Severin, Russia's consul in Wallachia. Severin was soon freed, after the intervention of Georg Ignaz, Freiherr von Metzburg, the Habsburg consul, who described Mavrogenes as acting maniacally and being terrified by the prospect of being at war.

As the city of Bucharest was spread over a large area and lacked any kind of fortifications, Mavrogenes decided to build some, including the digging of a moat from Cotroceni to Oborul Vechi, as well as reinforcing the walls of inns and monasteries (which were thus turned into crude fortresses). Unlike any other Phanariote ruler, he raised his own army, which reached 5–10,000 men and was equipped with several cannons, but it was unruly and poorly trained. In addition, Mavrogenes asked for the Ottoman army to help him seal the border with Habsburg Transylvania and reinforce the borders with Moldavia.

During that period, Mavrogenes used the services of Perdicari, an astrologer whom he trusted, and used both the predictions and his dreams for decisions in time of war, such as attacking the city of Kronstadt (present-day Braşov).

On 21 November a Habsburg army of 20,000 men, located in the Banat and led by Prince Josias of Coburg, started pressuring the Wallachian border and soon occupied fortified spots such as the Tismana and Sinaia monasteries; nevertheless, Mavrogenes continued to dismiss evidence of a Habsburg-Russian alliance. Two months later, on 28 January 1788, the boyars were summoned and informed that the Russians, led by Alexander Suvorov, had entered Moldavia, and that 25 of them were to lead military units and leave for Focşani as soon as possible, to engage Russian troops. However, just as the boyar contingents reached Buzău, they were ordered to return — it became apparent that Mavrogenes was just testing to see if boyars would betray him (indeed, two of them, members of the Câmpineanu and Cantacuzino families, fled to Transylvania). In order to avoid other betrayals, Mavrogenes arrested all the Wallachian boyars and dispatched them to an Ottoman fortress.

On 9 February 1788, Joseph II, the Habsburg Holy Roman Emperor, declared war on the Ottoman Empire and started spreading manifestos in Wallachia which explained the war's purpose and promised to "free the Romanian people from the Turkish yoke". At that time, Mavrogenes' army had about 11,000 soldiers, and there was also an army of about 15,000 Turks assisting him. With these forces, he obtained a few victories in the battles of Târgu Jiu and Câmpulung, and was able to prevent a Habsburg invasion for about a year.

These victories, together with the predictions astrologer made him confident in a victory and attacked Kronstadt from July to October 1788, but failed to take the city. As the winter of 1788–1789 was harsh, no further military actions were carried out. After Abdul Hamid died in April, the new sultan, Selim III, gave Mavrogenes about 5–6,000 soldiers from Rumelia.

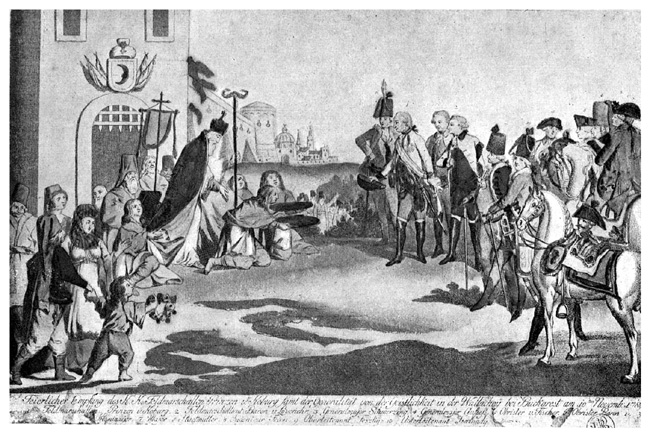
Coburg's troops being welcomed in Bucharest

In the meantime, the Russian army reported victories in Moldavia and rendezvoused with the Habsburg Army in Adjud, advancing toward Wallachia. On 21 July 1789 they fought the Wallacho-Ottoman army led by Grand Vizier Koca Yusuf Pasha in the Battle of Focşani, with an undecided result. A second confrontation occurred as the Battle of Rymnik; more than 10,000 died on the Ottomans' side.

Mavrogenes fled Bucharest on 26 October, accompanied by an army of 1,000 men, after appointing Dumitru Turnavitu as temporary Caimacam. Most Wallachians welcomed Prince Coburg's army, and the local boyars accepted a document which basically annexed Wallachia, while keeping autonomy to the same level as within the Ottoman Empire. The country was, however, soon hit by a major plague and famine; these were still claiming lives after the end of the war and through the early years of Alexander Mourousis' rule.

In June 1790, Mavrogenes, joined by a new Ottoman invading force, occupied the village of Calafat, but, after being attacked and defeated by the Habsburg troops, retreated and, all alone, crossed the Danube in a small boat. He wandered from village to village on the Bulgarian shore, until September 1790, when a kapucu sent by the Sultan killed him in the village of Byala. His body was buried on the shore of the Danube, while his head was sent to Constantinople, where it was impaled on a stake. His bones were later moved by his daughter, Eufrosina, to the Church of the Holy Apostles in Brussa.

== Legacy and reputation ==
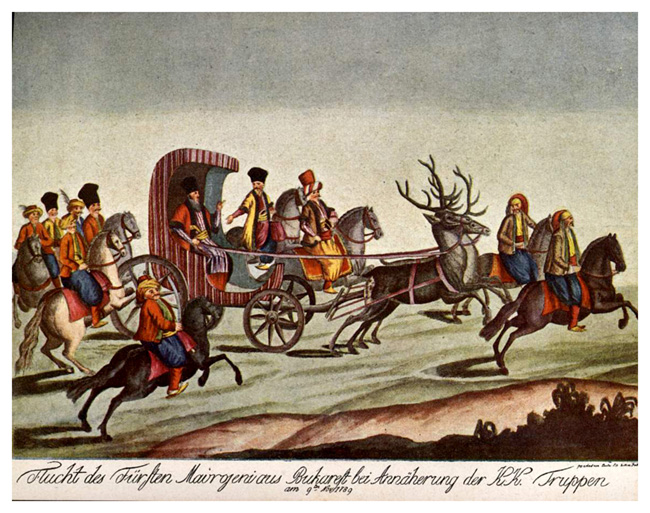
Mavrogenes in a deer-drawn carriage

Rigas Feraios, the Greek revolutionary who was a clerk for the Wallachian court, considered Mavrogenes "a villain, unworthy to be the ruler of Wallachia"; Feraios had begun a lifelong friendship with Osman Pazvantoğlu, future pasha and rebel leader, who at the time was a soldier in Mavrogenes' service — on one occasion, he defended and rescued Pazvantoğlu from the prince's wrath. Thomas Hope, who knew Mavrogenes personally, made him a character in a novel called Anastasius, or Memoirs of a Modern Greek.

Mavrogenes remained a controversial figure, and historians' opinions about him are often contradictory. The Romanian radical and historian Nicolae Bălcescu considered him an "original and fantastic man, despising the aristocracy, but having pity of the low-ranking and poor people". However, another 19th-century historian, Mihail Kogălniceanu thought of him as "a new Caligula, a tyrant for the boyars, priests, merchants and peasants". V. A. Urechia believed him to be in fact "a great patriot and organizer", while A. D. Xenopol saw him as maniacal and cruel.

== In fiction ==
Mavrogenes appears under the name Nicholas Mavroyeni in the 1819 novel Anastasius by Thomas Hope. The main protagonist, Anastasius, meets Mavroyeni during the campaign of Hasan-Pasha against the rebellious Arnaut mercenaries in Greece in the aftermath of the Orlov revolt. Back in Constantinople Mavroyeni takes Anastasius under his wing and employs him in the Phanar. He appears again later in the book as Hospodar of Valachia (Wallachia), where he says that he is known to be "a monster of rapaciousness and cruelty".

== See also ==
- History of Bucharest
- Wallachian military forces

| Preceded by Mihai Suţu | Prince of Wallachia; 1786–1789 | Succeeded by Habsburg occupation |
