= Charles-Frédéric Reinhard =

Württembergian-born French diplomat, essayist and politician (1761–1837)

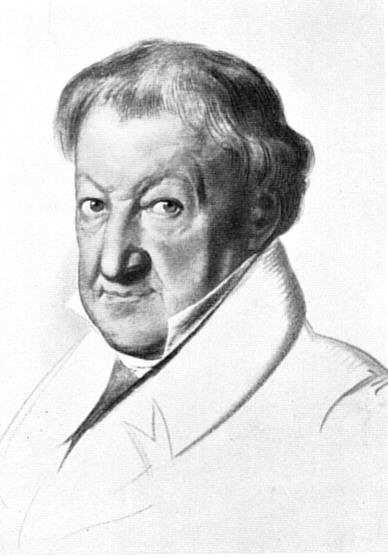

Minister of Foreign Affairs
- In office 20 July 1799 – 22 November 1799
- Preceded by: Charles Maurice de Talleyrand-Périgord
- Succeeded by: Charles Maurice de Talleyrand-Périgord

Personal details
- Born: Karl Friedrich Reinhard; 2 October 1761 Schorndorf, Duchy of Württemberg, Holy Roman Empire
- Died: 25 December 1837 (aged 76) Paris, Kingdom of France
- Spouse: Christine Reimarus
- Occupation: Diplomat; essayist

Charles-Frédéric, comte Reinhard (born Karl Friedrich Reinhard; 2 October 1761 – 25 December 1837) was a Württembergian-born French diplomat, essayist, and politician who briefly served as the Consulate's Minister of Foreign Affairs in 1799. A Girondist during the early stages of the French Revolution, he was dispatched to several countries before and after his ministerial mandate. In 1806–1807, he was appointed Consul and Resident to Moldavia, and subsequently arrested by the Russian Empire for one year. Reinhard was promoted under the Bourbon Restoration governments, which he represented to the German Confederation, and continued his political career under the July Monarchy.

== Early life ==
Born in Schorndorf (now in Baden-Württemberg, Germany), he was the son of a Protestant minister. He studied Theology at the University of Tübingen and met with Johann Wolfgang von Goethe (the two corresponded for a period).

Reinhard moved to Bordeaux in 1787, having been employed as tutor by a Huguenot family, and soon became an acquaintance of future Girondist leaders.

== Career ==
After the Revolution broke out, he asked to be naturalized, joined the Girondist club and, under the Legislative Assembly, moved to Paris, where he entered the diplomatic service. He was first detached as Legation Secretary to the Kingdom of Great Britain, under Ambassador Talleyrand, who became his mentor and political ally. With support from the Girondists, the National Convention appointed him First Secretary to the French Embassy in the Kingdom of Sicily.

=== Directory and Consulate ===
Despite the Girondists' fall, the Committee of Public Safety promoted him head of division at the Foreign Relations Department (1794). The French Directory made him Minister Plenipotentiary to the Hanseatic League in Hamburg (1795–1798), and later to the same position in the Provisional Government of Tuscany. On 12 October 1796, he married Christine Reimarus, the daughter of philosopher Hermann Samuel Reimarus and a native of Hamburg.

During the March 1799 Campaign, the took charge of Tuscany on orders from his superiors. During the period, he was admitted to the Institut de France, in the Académie des Sciences Morales et Politiques.

Reinhard replaced Talleyrand as Minister, under Director Emmanuel Joseph Sieyès, and served in this capacity until after Napoleon Bonaparte's Coup of 18 Brumaire 1799 (when Talleyrand again came to the office). In 1800, he was Minister Plenipotentiary to the Helvetic Republic, and, in 1801, to the Cisalpine Republic; in 1802, he was assigned to the same position in the Lower Saxon Circle, where, after 1804, he represented the French Empire. In 1803, when the Institut underwent reorganizing, he was moved to the Académie des Inscriptions et Belles-Lettres.

=== Moldavian assignment and Russian imprisonment ===
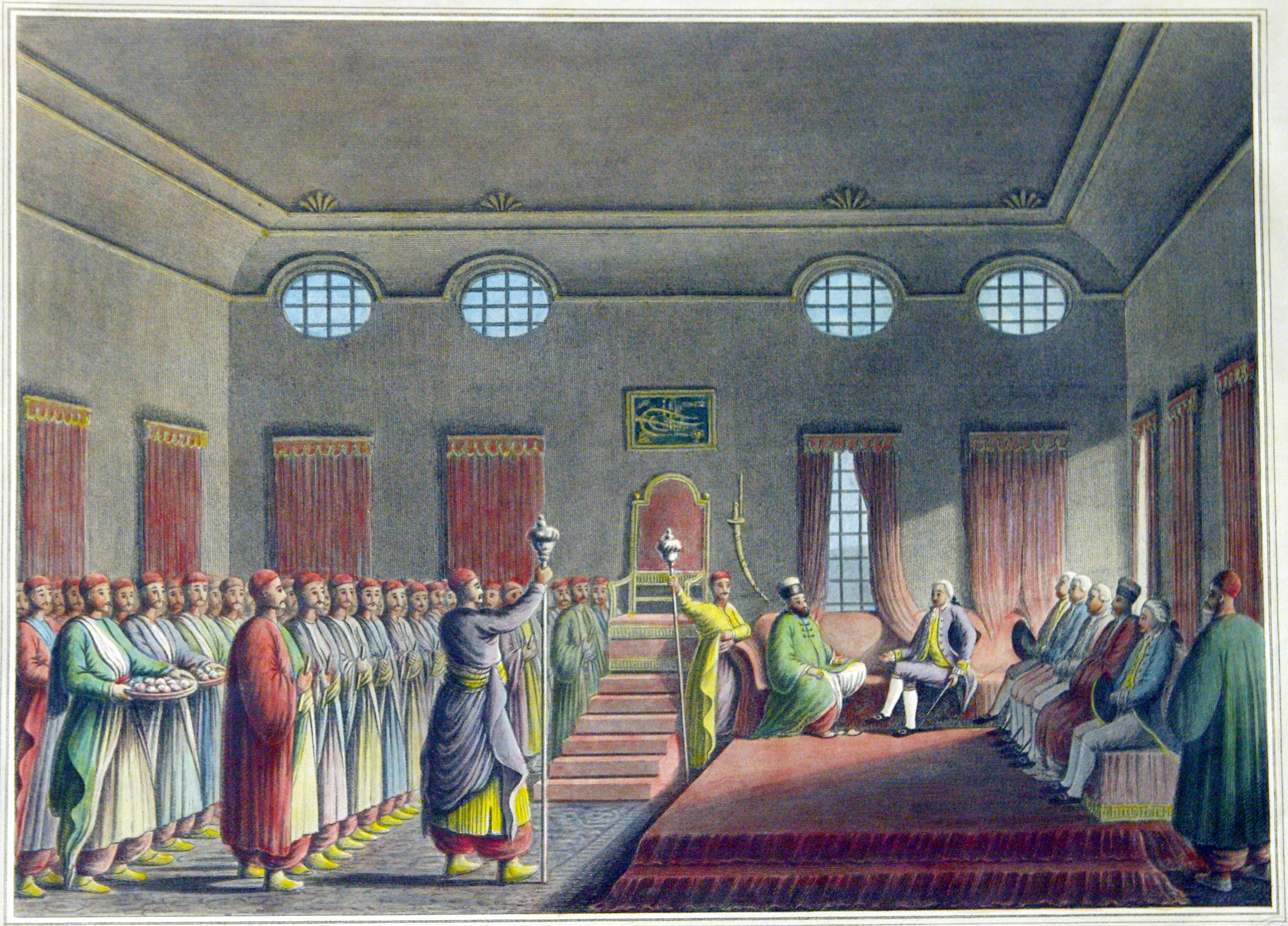
Alexander Mourousis welcoming the British ambassador in Curtea Nouă

Reinhard's assignment to Moldavia in late 1805-early 1806 was, according to Romanian historian Neagu Djuvara, unprecedented in that Reihard had occupied the high positions before being dispatched to Iaşi. Djuvara indicated that the measure was indicative of the Danubian Principalities' growth in importance at the time when Napoleon maneuvered against the Russian Empire. Reportedly, Reinhard unsuccessfully protested the measure, believing it to be equivalent to a demotion, and, as a result of this, his office was added the function of Resident. The latter move allegedly caused controversy in the Ottoman Empire, Moldavia's suzerain, since it seemed to imply that France gave additional recognition to Moldavia's ruler, Prince Alexander Mourousis.

After settling in Iaşi, the consul and his wife traveled extensively throughout Moldavia and into Wallachia and Austrian-ruled Transylvania. Letters addressed by Madame Reihard to her mother, later gathered in a volume, provide detail on the two countries' societies: after they visited Prince Constantine Ypsilantis in his Bucharest residence, the newly renovated Curtea Nouă, she recorded that the palace was unappealing and poorly maintained; amazed that houses in Bucharest lacked writing desks, they were advised to hold writing material on their lap; also according to Christine Reihard, roads in northern Wallachia presented serious challenges to travelers. She left additional detail on the state of Roma slaves, claiming that, before 1806, an unnamed boyar from the Sturdza family had employed a group of Roma at a factory on his estate, but that the project was abandoned when the employees expressed suffering over not being allowed their traditional freedom of movement and trade.

Reportedly unbeknown to Consul Reihard, the French Ambassador to the Porte Horace Sébastiani, persuaded Sultan Selim III that Princes Mourousis and Ypsilantis were secretly plotting an alliance with Russia. Consequently, Selim sent orders for the rulers to be deposed, provoking the Russo-Turkish War of 1806–1812. This exposed Reihard and his family to risk, and, after the Imperial Russian Army, commanded by Ivan Ivanovich Michelson and Mikhail Andreyevich Miloradovich, stormed into Moldavia, they were arrested. The latter action, going against international law, saw the Reinhards transportation to regions of southern Russia, where they spent the following winter before being released with official apologies.

=== Return ===
Upon the family's return to Paris, Charles Reinhard, made a baron of the Empire, was appointed Minister Plenipotentiary to the Kingdom of Westphalia, and, in May 1814, was Head of Chancellery at the French Department of Foreign Affairs (serving until Napoleon's fall and the 1814 Bourbon Restoration). He kept a low profile during the Hundred Days, and, after King Louis XVIII regained his throne, was made a comte, awarded a position in the Conseil d'État, and received the office of Minister Plenipotentiary to the German Confederation in Frankfurt (December 1815 – 1829).

Following a brief hiatus before the July Revolution, Reinhard represented Louis Philippe I in the Kingdom of Saxony. The July Monarchy admitted him a Peer in October 1832. Also in that year, Charles Reinhard regained the Académie des Sciences Morales et Politiques. He died in Paris five years later.

Political offices
Preceded by Charles Maurice de Talleyrand-Périgord	Foreign Minister of France; 1799	Succeeded by Charles Maurice de Talleyrand-Périgord
