= Michael Drakos Soutzos =

Prince of Moldavia from 1792 to 1795

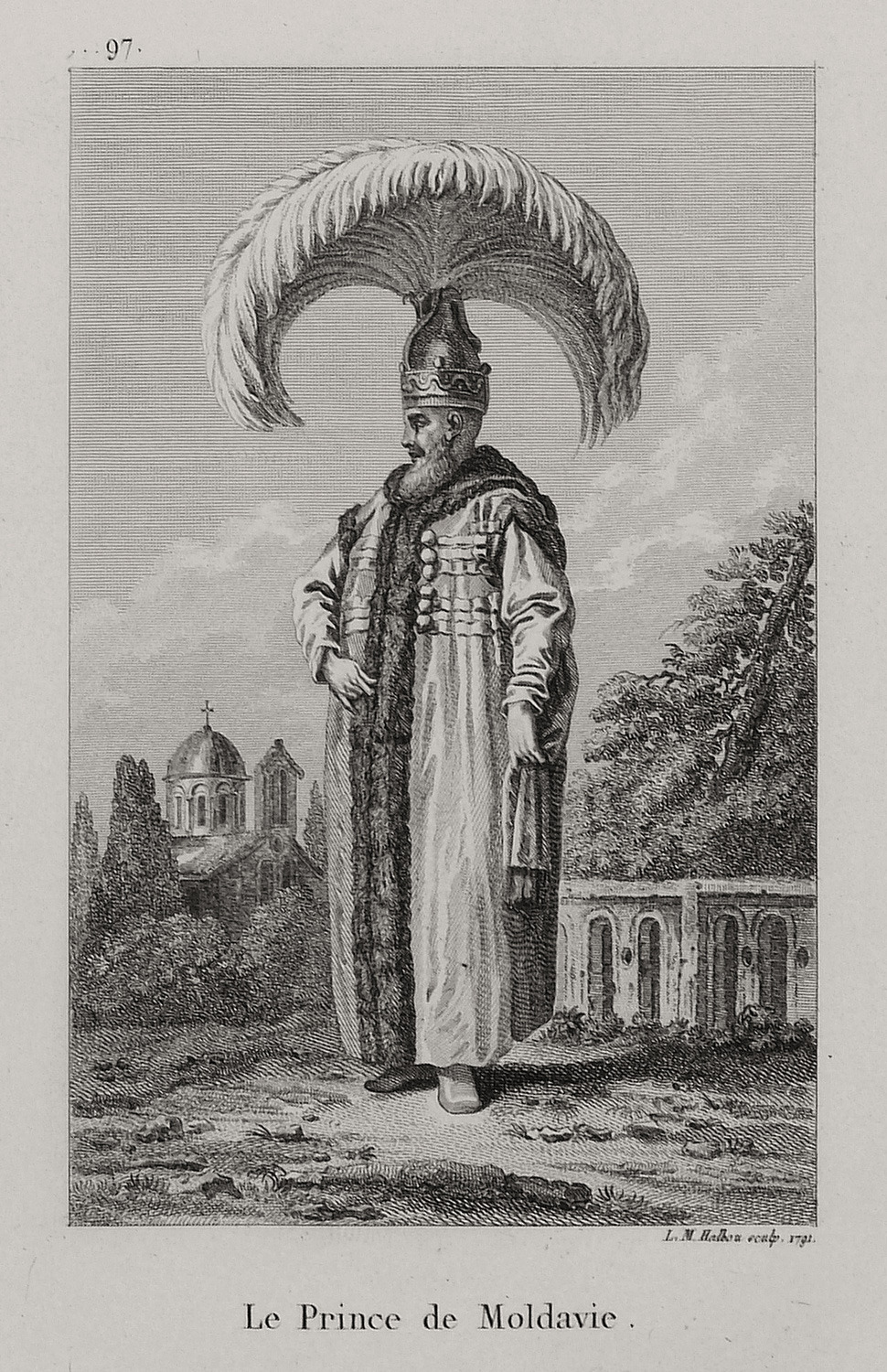
- Soutzos in ceremonial attire at his 1792 investiture as Prince of Moldavia

Prince of Wallachia (1st reign)
- Reign: 17 July 1783 – 6 April 1786
- Predecessor: Nicholas Caradja
- Successor: Nicholas Mavrogenes

Prince of Wallachia (2nd reign)
- Reign: March 1791 – 10 January 1793
- Predecessor: Nicholas Mavrogenes
- Successor: Alexander Mourouzis

Prince of Moldavia
- Reign: 10 January 1793 – 5 May 1795
- Predecessor: Alexander Mourouzis
- Successor: Alexandru Callimachi

Prince of Wallachia (3rd reign)
- Reign: 9 October 1801 – 22 May 1802
- Predecessor: Alexander Mourouzis
- Successor: Alexandros Soutzos
- Born: 1730
- Died: 1803 (aged 72–73); Constantinople, Ottoman Empire (now Istanbul, Turkey)
- House: Soutzos family
- Religion: Orthodox

Michael Drakos Soutzos (Greek: Μιχαήλ Δράκος Σούτζος; Romanian: Mihai Draco Suțu; 1730 – 1803) was a Prince of Moldavia between 1792 and 1795. A member of the Soutzos family of Phanariotes (descended from the Drakos family), he was the grandfather of Michael Soutzos, himself a ruler of Moldavia between 1819 and 1821.

== Early life ==
Michael was born as the youngest son and youngest child of Boyar Constantin Drakos-Soutzos (d. 1757) and his wife, Princess Maria Rossetti (b. 1702).

== Third rule in Wallachia ==
His predecessor, Alexander Mourouzis, frightened by the incursions of Osman Pazvantoğlu asked to be dismissed and for that, he paid money to the Ottoman authorities. In April 1801, Pazvantoğlu's troops continued their raids in Wallachia under the command of Manef Ibrahim, defeating the Ottoman Army despite having only a thousand horsemen, compared to the Ottoman side which had 8,000 troops.

They took Râmnicu Vâlcea, Govora and moved toward Bucharest. By May 15, 1802 most of the inhabitants of the city fled toward Brașov and Vălenii de Munte.

On May 18, the Albanian and Turkish troops of Bucharest asked for their payment and Suțu promised them to pay in two days, after which he left for Colentina, outside the city. The boyars, who were supposed to wait for Soutzos, heard rumours about unrest at the Royal Court and thought that Suțu was killed, so they left toward Moldavia. Suțu, having not found the boyars at the Ghica house of Colentina, left for Transylvania.

As Bimbașa Sava, the commander of the Bucharest garrison, saw that Soutzos had left without paying them, he started following Soutzos. This left Bucharest without any troops, allowing tramps to organize in gangs, which robbed the Royal Court. Their leader, Melanos, took the royal hat and marched on the streets of Bucharest, wanting to set Bucharest on fire, which was prevented by the intervention of a Turkish unit from Cotroceni.

Due to his exile, Soutzos was deposed by the Ottomans in the summer of 1802.

== See also ==
- Drakos family

== Notes ==
Preceded by Nicolae Caradja	Grand Dragoman of the Porte; 1782–1785	Succeeded by Alexandru Callimachi
Preceded by Nicolae Caradja	Prince of Wallachia; 1783–1786	Succeeded by Nicolae Mavrogheni
Preceded by Habsburg occupation	Prince of Wallachia; 1791–1793	Succeeded by Alexander Mourouzis
Preceded by Alexander Mourouzis	Prince of Wallachia; 1801–1802	Succeeded by Alexandros Soutzos
Preceded by Alexander Mourouzis	Prince of Moldavia; 1792–1795	Succeeded by Alexandru Callimachi
