= Constantine Hangerli =

Prince of Wallachia from 1797 to 1799

Prince of Wallachia
- Reign: November 1797 – January 1799
- Predecessor: Alexander Ypsilantis
- Successor: Alexander Mourouzis
- Born: c. 1760; Istanbul, Ottoman Empire
- Died: 18 February 1799 (aged 38–39); Bucharest, Wallachia
- Religion: Orthodox Christian

Constantine Hangerli (Greek: Κωνσταντίνος Χατζερής, Konstantinos Chatzeris; c. 1760 – 18 February 1799), also written as Constantin Hangerliu, was a Prince of Wallachia between 1797 and the time of his death. He was the brother of Alexander Hangerli, who served as Prince of Moldavia in 1807.

== Biography ==
=== Early life and investiture ===
As a Phanariote, Hangerli claimed heritage from the Byzantine family of the Palaiologos. He was married to Doamna Roxana, who survived his death. According to one account, the surname Hangerli (Hanjeri) had been assigned to one of his ancestors by Sultan Mehmed IV, after allegedly saving his life by curing him of a potentially fatal illness. The name was based on the word handjer, which was indicative of closeness to the Sultan's person. The Hangerlis were related to other high-ranking Greek families, including the Ypsilantis and the Mourousis.

After serving as Dragoman of the Fleet, Constantine surprised foreign diplomats through his appointment to the throne in Bucharest, in competition with the much more prestigious Alexander Ypsilantis. He probably owed this rise to the influence of his friend and former associate, Kapudan Pasha Husein Küçük: the latter had been dispatched to quell the rebellion of Osman Pazvantoğlu in Rumelia, and requested that Wallachia be made secure through the investiture of a trustworthy prince.

Hangerli reached Bucharest on 4 January 1798, breaking with local custom by entering the city area through Podul Mogoșoaiei, instead of Calea Șerban Vodă. Bucharesters believed this to be a bad omen, indicative of an "unwise rule". Like all Phanariotes, he stopped at Văcărești Monastery to prepare for the official inauguration. For unknown reasons, he stayed there for more than a month, before temporarily settling in the Saint Sava Monastery, where he remained until Curtea Nouă was completely repaired.

=== "Hangerli's winter" and conflicts with Husein Küçük ===
Hangerli increased taxes to a very high level; new fees were created, including a special one for widowers. These measures were prompted by the substantial demands of the Porte, who was faced with Pazvantoğlu's major military successes, as well as by the prince's wish to increase his own revenue.

The taxation reached its peak with the re-introduction of the despised văcărit tax (per head of cattle owned), which had been dismissed for perpetuity by his predecessor, Constantine Mavrocordatos – Hangerli purchased the lifting of a curse on the latter (cast in 1763) from Gregory V, Patriarch of Constantinople. Despite this, the tax continued to face stiff opposition from the part of Orthodox clergy and Metropolitan Dosiftei Filiti. The boyars also refused to sign the decree, and Hangerli had to bribe four of them (among them Nicolae Brâncoveanu and Cornescu) in order to agree to countersign it; so as to avoid a rebellion against Hangerli, all the boyars were subsequently exempt from this new tax.

The early months of 1798, during which princely envoys raided the country while peasants attempted to hide their livestock, became known as "Hangerli's winter". Results of the inventory showed an abundance of cattle, but the population lacked access to currency. As a result, Hangerli enforced extortion through torture (it is probable that several peasants were killed in an attempt to collect their entire possessions – "if they pay, no one will get killed" was supposedly a reply uttered by Hangerli himself).

The ensuing war between the Ottomans and Pazvantoğlu brought several defeats for the former, prompting Husein Küçük to take refuge in Bucharest. Fearing the anger of Selim III, he attempted to throw the blame on Hangerli for not having raised enough funds. Catching news of this, the prince tried to intrigue against Küçük, but was disfavored after a coalition of his political adversaries began campaigning against him. According to the chronicler Dionisie Eclesiarhul, Hangerli attempted to buy back Küçük's protection by having him attend a banquet during which prostitutes, disguised and introduced as members of the most powerful boyar families, competed for the pasha's attention.

=== Execution ===
On 11 February 1799, the sultan issued a firman to execute Hangerli on the spot, and a kapucu was dispatched to Bucharest, accompanied by an executioner (whom Dionisie described as "a frightening Moor"). The pair made efforts to travel in secrecy, and, upon their arrival, spent three days in seclusion at the Beilic Inn.

Dismissing the warning of his postelnic (according to a contemporary account), Hangerli, after being read the firman, was attacked by the two as he was attempting to call his guards: he was strangled by the Moor, shot twice in the chest and stabbed once by the kapucu, and finally decapitated. The guards, who stormed in after hearing the shots, were shown the firman, and could no longer intervene. The kapucu displayed Hangerli's head for all witnesses to see, stating: "Here is the dog that ate away the sultan's rayah". He then presented it to Roxana, with the words: "Here is the head of your husband".

Hangerli's remains were exposed in the palace's courtyard for a few days; a passer-by aimed a para at the severed head, and was recorded saying: "Here, gorge on money" (Satură-te de bani). The prince was ultimately buried in the Bucharest church of St Spyridon the New.

Zilot Românul, who wrote his verses sometime after, praised Sultan Selim for having "made good out of evil" by "unwittingly deliver[ing] us from the angarea [or angarà, an antiquated word referring to heavy taxes]".

== Notes ==
Preceded by Alexander Ypsilantis	Prince of Wallachia; 1797–1799	Succeeded by Alexander Mourousis
