= Nicholas Caradja =

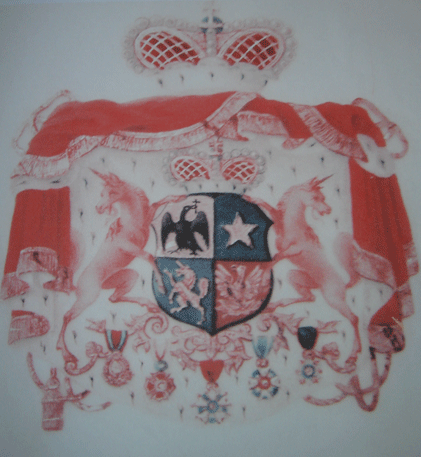

Prince of Wallachia
- Reign: 15 January 1782 – 17 July 1783
- Predecessor: Alexander Ypsilantis
- Successor: Michael Drakos Soutzos
- Born: 1737; Istanbul
- Died: 1784 (aged 46–47); Istanbul
- Religion: Orthodox

Nicholas Caradja (Greek: Νικόλαος Καρατζάς, Romanian: Nicolae Vodă Caragea; 1737–1784) was a Phanariote Prince of Wallachia, who reigned between 5 January 1782 and 6 July 1783.

== Early life ==
He was born as the son of Prince Konstantin Caradja (d. 1771) and his wife, Zefira Soutzos (d. 1791).

== Biography ==
Prior to his reign, he was the Grand Dragoman of the Ottoman Empire in Constantinople (1777–1782).

== Reign ==
Under his reign, police provisions taken concerned public hygiene such as chimney sweeping and the control of coffeehouses, inns, and ways. Unauthorized carrying of uniforms and weapons was prohibited, in order to avoid mutiny by those opposed to his taxation policy. Passports were introduced during his reign. Both to control the entry of foreigners and the exit of the discontented.

== Marriage and issue ==
He was married to Tarisa Michalopoulos and had:

- Eufrosona Caradja; married Prince Dimitrius Ghica
- Zamfira Caradja; married Prince Alexander Mavrocordato
- Smaragda Caradja; married Prince Nicholas Mavrocordato (1744-1818)
- Maria Caradja; married Boyar Demetrius Manos, Postelnic of Wallachia
- Constantin Caradja; married Princess Ralu Mourouzi and had issue
- Alexandru Iorgu Caradja; married Marghioala Slatineanu and had issue
- Ioan Caradja (1770-1829), Dragoman of the Fleet 1799-1800; married Ecaterina Rodomani and had issue

Preceded by Constantine Mourouzis	Grand Dragoman of the Porte; 1777–1782	Succeeded by Michael Drakos Soutzos
Preceded by Alexander Ypsilantis	Prince of Wallachia; 1782–1783	Succeeded by Michael Drakos Soutzos
