= Curtea Nouă =

Now-demolished palace in Bucharest, Romania

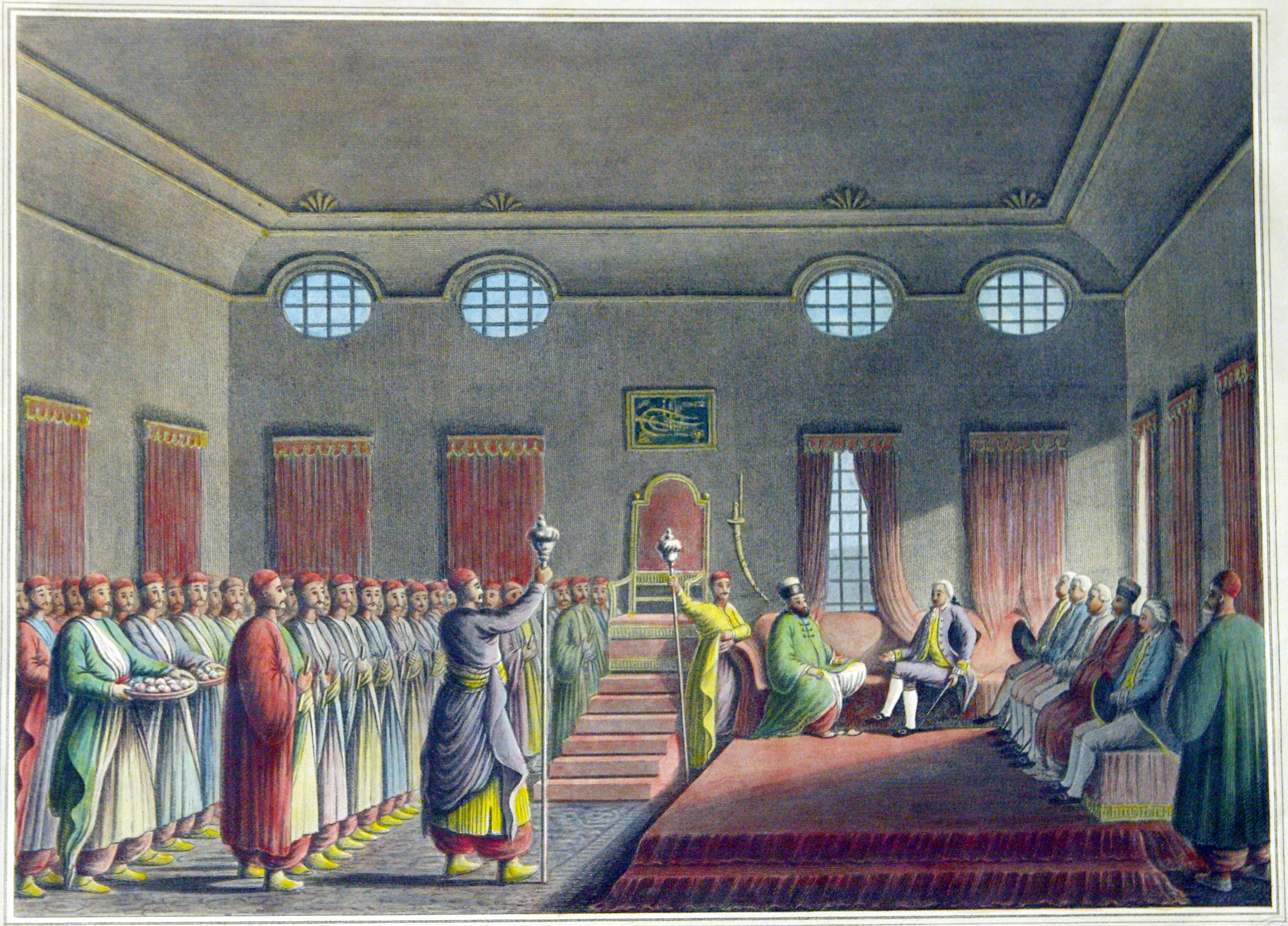
Alexander Mourousis welcoming the British ambassador to the Ottoman Empire Robert Liston in Curtea Nouă

Curtea Nouă (Romanian pronunciation: [ˈkurte̯a ˈnowə], New Court) was the residence of the Princes of Wallachia between 1776 and 1812.

Located near the Mihai Vodă Monastery, on Dealul Spirii in Bucharest, it was built between 1775 and 1776 during the rule of Alexander Ypsilantis, and it meant to replace the old princely court at Curtea Veche.

== Location and general description ==
Curtea Noua appears at the top of the Sulzer map (1781) It is isolated from the city of Bucharest, across the Dambovita river.

Curtea Nouă was described as being in Byzantine style, having three floors, four staircases and three towers.

The Swiss chronicler Sulzer left a description of the building which suggests that he was not very impressed with it: "This palace is in all respects irregular and ill-proportioned, just like the boyars' residences, about which we mentioned that are built in octagonal and even twelve sides polygonal shapes, from well placed bricks, but due to the lack of wood, having the windows, doors and floors ill-fitted." His opinion may have been colored by the fact that Transylvanian builders and architects were employed for its construction, who were forced to return without being paid.

== Construction ==
Construction was begun with architects and laborers from Brasov, and was continued and completed with work force brought from the Balkans and locally sourced. We know the name of one of the architects – Spiridon Macri (a Greek from Italy). Atanasiu Comnen Ipsilanti gives also the names of the boyars (ispravnici) appointed by the ruler to oversee the construction: Marele Ban Dumitrache Ghica, Marele Vornic Nicolae Dudescu and Medelnicerul Ion Vilard.

The court was not only the residence of the ruler (Domnului) but also the seat of the chancellaries: Inaltul Divan Domnesc, Logofetiile, and even the secret prison where disgraced boyars were held in arrest.

In the 20th century, archeologists discovered under the place where the palace stood two cellars and two secret passages.

== Life at the court ==
From Sestini, Ispilanti's secretary, we have an vignette of life at Curtea Noua. "Laziness and vanity have conjured a new and strange fashion in Bucharest. All boyars, with or without any business, spend their mornings at Court, chatting in circles in different rooms. This custom spread also to traders and one does not count for much who does not go and wastes his time in this fashion."

From a document dated 1804 (during the rule of Ypsilanti) we find that "near the gardens of the Dudescu residence [near the Court] there is a "baltac" [stale water] which is infecting the entire neighborhood. The ruler decrees that the master of the place must drain it, or else, whoever drains it should become the master of the place."

In 1806 Madame Reinhard was received in audience at Court, and described the experience of having to walk through a yard with chickens and past stables before passing through the "Harem" and several darkened rooms to reach the princely chambers.

In the same year 1806 General Langeron left us the description of a reception at Court given in honor of the Russian General Milaradovici who had just won a battle against the Turks and drove them out of Bucharest. In his honor the palace staircase was decorated with heads of Turkish soldiers lit in candlelight.

== Documented events and chronology ==
Curtea Noua has been the residence of several rulers of Wallachia.

Alexandru Ypsilanti built Curtea Noua as the new residence of the Wallachian princes.

Nicolae Caragea is mentioned in a document dated May 1783 as taking temporary residence over the summer at the Cotroceni Monastery.

Mihai Sutu (Aug 1783)

Nicolae Mavrogenes (Mavrogheni) arrives in Bucharest on 17 May 1786 from Constantinople and is enthroned. He starts a renovation project of the Court building, financed with a dedicated tax levied on merchants and boyars. In November 1789 Bucharest is occupied by Austrian troops, following hostilities between Austria and Russia on one side, and Turkey on the other. The Prince of Coburg takes temporary residence in Curtea Noua. Mavrogheni leaves the capital and takes refuge south of Danube where he is assassinated by Turks, probably as punishment for having abandoned his post.

Mihai Sutu returns in 1791.

Hangerliu is one of the most colorful characters of this period. A ruler with extravagant tastes, he organized parties and orgies at the court. One of the latter was recorded as given in honor of the Commander of the Ottoman fleet, Capudan Pasha, during his visit to Bucharest. Hangerliu had a tragic ending. He was assassinated in Feb 1799 by an executioner sent by the Sultan.

Alexander Mourousis: He ruled first during 1793-1796 and again 1798–1801. He can be see in the illustration above, meeting Robert Liston, the British ambassador to the Ottoman Empire, at some time during his first rule during 1793–1796. The dating is possible because we know that Robert Liston was posted as British ambassador to the United States (as the second British diplomat to this country after the Independence War) from 10 March 1796 until 1800. He returned for a second posting to Constantinople in 1812, which is after Mourousis' rule.

During his second rule, Bucharest was invaded in May 1801 by Carjalii, a band of marauders from South of the Danube. Many of the Bucharest residents left the city and took the road to Brasov. The city was left without protection, and was taken over by mobs, who also set up mock court at Curtea Noua. This led to the legend of the Craii de la Curtea Noua.

Ioan Gheorghe Caragea (1801 - 1814)

The history of the palace comes to an end during the rule of Caragea with the disastrous fire which burnt it down on 22 December 1812. There exists a description of the event from Count Lagarde, a French traveller who was in Bucharest at the time. "At five in the morning a terrible racket woke me up. I thought that the city is under attack; a blinding bright light shone into my room. I looked out the window and saw the palace of the Prince of Wallachia in flames. Set up on a height, it brought to mind the Vesuvius in an eruption; the flames it threw around threatened to set the entire city on fire. Bucharest, a city of wooden buildings, was in danger of being consumed by flames from one end to the other. I dressed up quickly and went outside to watch more closely the spectacle. Help was quickly summoned and was largely effective. Firemen, covered with helmets and a kind of Roman clothing, were courageously climbing the roofs, and entered houses to remove furniture. Despite their efforts the fire was spreading rapidly. All inhabitants of the city were up and out on the streets. It was as bright as in the middle of the day. A short while later we were informed that the fire was put out, but the Palace and all it contained were consumed by the flames."

From now on Curtea Noua will be known as Curtea Arsă ("Burnt Court"). Its prominent location on the top of the Dealul Spirii next to the Mihai-Voda Monastery made it visible from far away. It became a popular subject for artists visiting the city, who left drawings and paintings of the ruins. Michel Bouquet (1807-1890) left lithographs showing views of Bucharest during his travels in eastern Europe in the 1840s. Carol Szathmari (1812 - 1887) left paintings and sketches of the burnt ruins.
