= Osman Pazvantoğlu =

Ottoman soldier and rebel

Pasha Osman Pazvantoğlu
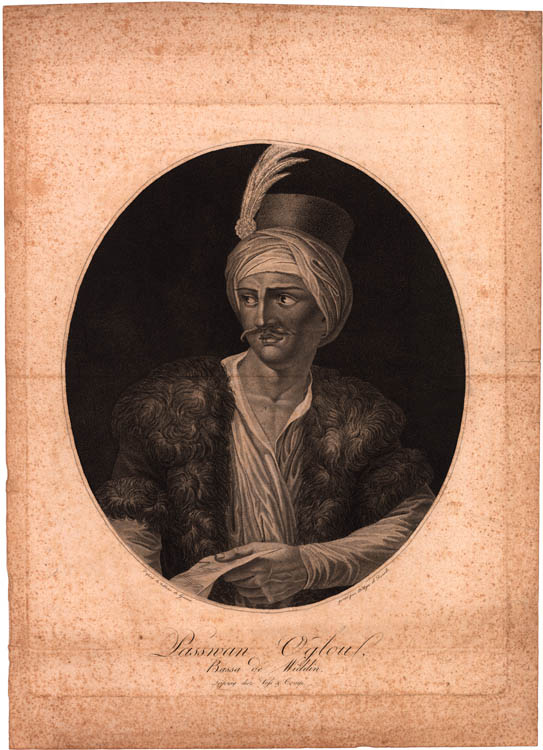
- 19th-century portrait
- Born: 1758; Vidin, Sanjak of Vidin, Ottoman Empire
- Died: January 27, 1807; Vidin, Sanjak of Vidin, Ottoman Empire
- Military career
- Allegiance: Ottoman Empire (1788–1793, 1799, 1805–1807); Pashalik of Vidin (1794–1807)
- Units: Mercenaries of Nicholas Mavrogenes (before 1787); Rebel Janissaries (1792–)
- Conflicts: Revolt of Osman Pazvantoğlu; Battle of Vidin (1793); Siege of Vidin (1795); Battle of Nikopol (1797); Battle of Pleven (1797); Siege of Vidin (1798); Pazvantoğlu's raids in Wallachia; Burning of Craiova (1800); Raid on Oltenia (1801); Panic of Bucharest (1802); First Serbian Uprising; Battle of Deligrad

Osman Pazvantoğlu (1758–27 January 1807) was an Ottoman mercenary, the de facto ruler of the Sanjak of Vidin after 1794 as a rebel against Ottoman rule, amnestied and recognized in 1799 as pasha by the sultan, continuing rebellion the next year. Initially serving as a mercenary in Wallachia, he wrested the Sanjak of Vidin and ruled in defiance of the Ottoman sultan, and fought other Ottoman pashas and made incursions into the Sanjak of Smederevo, Wallachia, and Serbia during the First Serbian Uprising.

== Origin ==
Osman's grandfather Osman, who was of Bosniak descent from Tuzla, was a night watch guard or shop guard in Plovdiv, Adrianople and Vidin, as the surname relates (pazvant, "watcher"), that participated in the Russo-Turkish War (1735–1739) and distinguished himself in an attack in Krajina (now eastern Serbia). For this, he received property from the sultan and lived in Vidin. In Vidin, his son Omar Pazvant-zade (Osman's father) was born. According to François Pouqueville, grandfather Osman was a bandit who was executed by impalement at Pristina, and it was Omar who participated in the war. Omar is mentioned in 1764 as having villages, chiftliks, water mills, meadows, wineyards, and more, in the Vidin nahiya, and was the Janissary agha of the 31st orta. Omar was temporarily removed from Vidin, and served in the Belgrade Fortress.

== Career ==
=== Austro-Turkish war ===
Pazvantoğlu is mentioned as quarreling with his father, then making peace on the interference of the Vidin population. The two joined forces and together removed their rivals in the area, which led to unrest in late 1787. The unrest led to Sultan Abdul Hamid I issuing a firman (decree) to Mehmed Pasha of Vidin and Abdi Pasha of Belgrade to get rid of the rebellious Omar and Osman and protect the cities from their violence. Abdi Pasha was caught up with the threat of an Austrian invasion, while Mehmed Pasha set out and managed to disperse the Vidin rebels, forcing them to take refuge in Krajina. From Krajina, some of them went into Serbia and Bosnia, while Omar and Osman went to Niš and then found refuge with Memiş Pasha at Ada Kaleh.

The Austro-Turkish war began in February 1788, and Orșova was lost, with Memiş Pasha tasked to return it. He asked Wallachian prince and Ottoman vassal Nicholas Mavrogenes to give "courageous" Omar Pazvant-zade "who was denigrated with slander" an army to attack Orsova from Černec. Omar fled Černec with his 17 men and ahead of an Austrian incursion on 18 April, and was captured and executed on the order of Mehmed Pasha of Vidin. Osman had in the meantime joined Mavrogenes' army and fought in Wallachia. He decided to avenge his father and in 1789 took a band which surprise attacked Vidin and forced Mehmed Pasha to give up the garrison, but remained alive with his small entourage after showing the Sultan's ferman on his father's execution. When Belgrade was besieged in July 1789, Osman left Vidin and joined serasker Yusuf Pasha at Kladovo. Osman was defeated by an Austrian Free Corps unit at the Morava and retreated, and after the Ottoman reconquest of the Danube points, he returned to Vidin by autumn 1790.

Osman befriended the Greek Rigas Feraios while in Wallachia, when Feraios became the clerk of Mavrogenes. When Pazvantoğlu disobeyed Mavrogenes on one occasion, he was saved from reprisals through Feraios' intervention.

=== Rise ===
In springtime 1792, Osman is mentioned as a Janissary leader in Vidin. Despite the end of the war, soldiers remained on the terrain and became bandits and robbers, employed as mercenaries to Turk lords in the Balkans, becoming kircali. The other disorderly group present in the Balkans were the expelled Janissaries from the Belgrade Pashalik, of which the majority gathered in Vidin. In 1792, the Austrians tried to have the 400 prisoners of war in Vidin released, but the Vidin Pasha explained that the Vidin Turks under Pazvantoğlu refused to accept this. In May 1792 a ferman ordered for the release of all Austrian prisoners in Vidin, but this was not done, and another ferman sentenced Pazvantoğlu and his two friends to expulsion to Kars due to the rebellion against the former Vidin Pasha and their gathering of "rebels of the Belgrade environs to provoke unrest in the empire". Pazvantoğlu paid the new Vidin Pasha off, to remain in Vidin with his followers, and even received the right to collect the tax on the gypsies in the Sanjak of Vidin, which showed his growing reputation. The expulsion to Kars was terminated by the Sultan, and Pazvantoğlu's entourage was left to live in Vidin "only in peace". The Belgrade Janissaries, who had been expelled earlier and now revolted and took the Belgrade town, were expelled in November 1792.

In 1793, he undertook a military expedition to the Sanjak of Smederevo but was soundly defeated by the Serbs in Ottoman service at the Battle of Kolari.

Having gathered a large army of mercenaries, he revolted against the Ottoman sultan Selim III, and, acting as an independent ruler, minted his own coins and had diplomatic relations with foreign states (including the French Republic). In 1798, he held territories which spread from the Danube to the Balkan Mountains and from Belgrade to Varna.

The 1797-8 military expedition of Küçük Hüseyin Pasha (having 100,000 soldiers) failed in its goal to conquer Vidin and capture Pazvantoğlu partially due to the French invasion of Egypt, and indirectly resulted in the fall and execution of Prince Constantine Hangerli, after Küçük accused him of not having provided the Ottoman Army with enough funds. His power had grown to the point that Napoleon and Talleyrand had hoped to have him become the Ottoman Sultan under French protection. He also attempted to annex the Sanjak of Smederevo but was stopped by Stanko Arambašić and his 16,000 Serbian soldiers in Ottoman service. In 1799, the Ottoman sultan forgave Pazvantoğlu's rebellion and agreed to make him a pasha.

For contacting the French regarding the Greek cause in the Ottoman Empire, Rigas Feraios was imprisoned and tortured at Belgrade in the Sanjak of Smederevo, then sent to Constantinople to be sentenced by Sultan Selim III. While in transit, Feraios and his five collaborators were strangled, with the bodies thrown into the Danube, to prevent their being rescued by Pazvantoğlu.

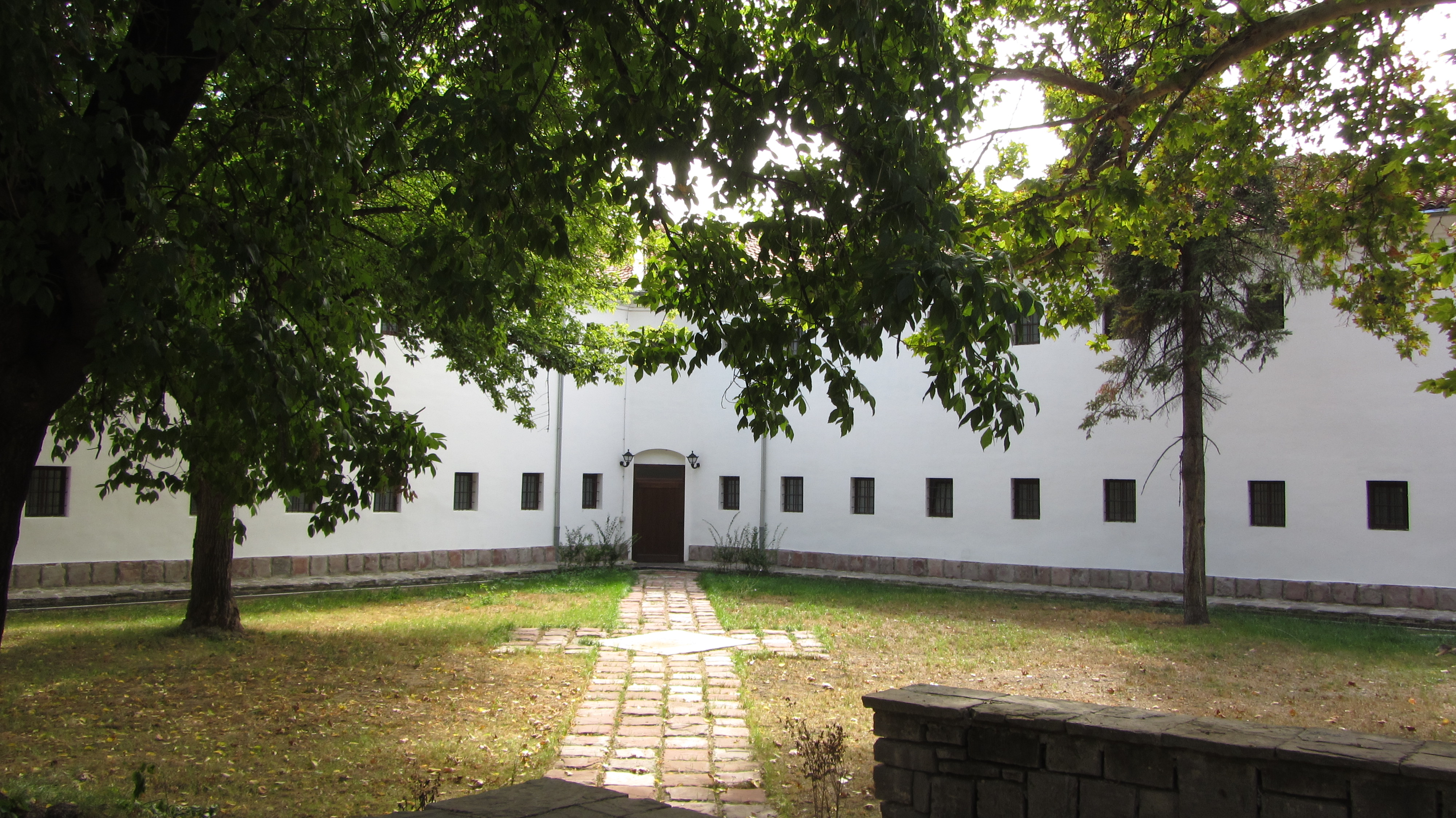
Krastata Kazarma (Cross-shaped Barracks) in Vidin, Pazvantoğlu's headquarters since 1801.

Pazvantoğlu often made violent raids in Wallachia, where he often set on fire the cities which he plundered. In 1800, his troops, colloquially known as pasvangii, set on fire a large portion of the city of Craiova: out of 7,000 houses, only around 300 were still standing after the fire stopped. This caused Prince Alexander Mourousis to hand in his resignation to Sultan Selim, a rare statement of defeat in the context of Phanariote reigns.

In late January 1802, Bucharest was gripped by panic after rumors spread that the pasha had sent his army in its direction. Prince Michael Soutzos left the city and ordered its defense by the remaining garrison of Albanians, but disagreements over payment owed led the troops themselves to discard the place; the city soon fell to widespread disorder and the brief rule of beggars and vagabonds (who apparently mimicked a coronation ceremony) which was ended by the violent intervention of Ottoman troops stationed in the vicinity, and ultimately led to Soutzos' deposition.

== Legacy ==
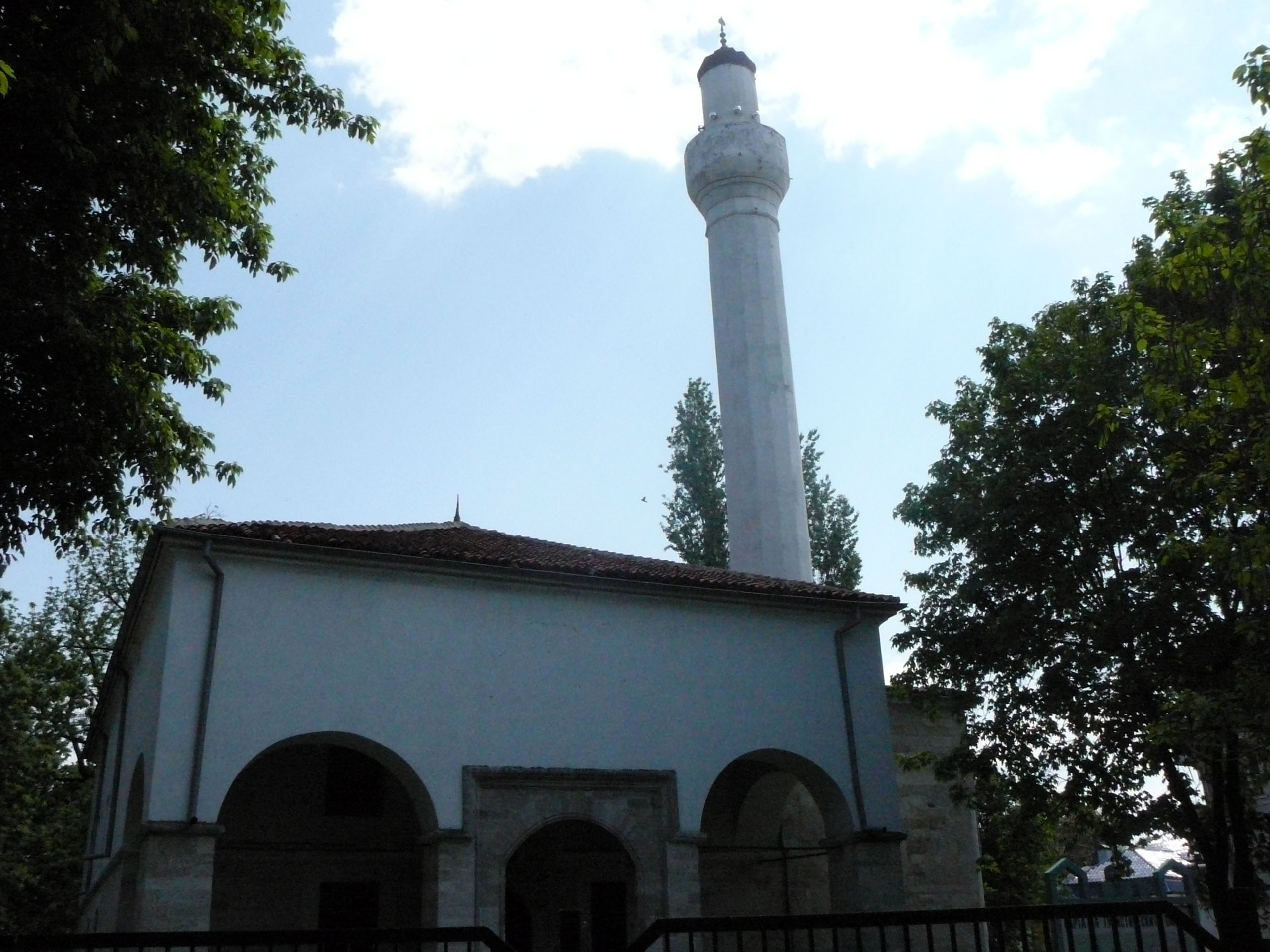
Osman Pazvantoğlu Mosque in Vidin

In Vidin, Bulgaria, the capital of Pazvantoğlu's domain, there are several landmarks built during his rule that still stand today. These include the military facility Krastata Kazarma (from Bulgarian: Cross-shaped Barracks), built in 1801, and a mosque (1801–1802) with a library building (1802–1803), dedicated to the pasha's father. All of them are classed as Monuments of Culture.

The mosque-library compound is thought to have also included a madrasah (Islamic school) and a small Muslim cloister, both of which have not survived until today.

== Annotations ==
1. His name in Turkish was Osman Pazvantoğlu (Ottoman Turkish: عثمان). It was rendered variously as Pazvan Oglu and Pazwan Oglu in German.

== Sources ==
- Pantelić, Dušan (1949). Београдски пашалук пред Први српски устанак: 1794-1804. Belgrade: Научна књига.
- Neagu Djuvara, Între Orient și Occident. Țările române la începutul epocii moderne ("Between Orient and Occident. The Romanian Lands at the beginning of the modern era"), Humanitas, Bucharest, 1995
- Ștefan Ionescu, Bucureștii în vremea fanarioților ("Bucharest in the Time of the Phanariotes"), Editura Dacia, Cluj, 1974
- Povestea lui Pazvante Chioru
- Pazvantoglu.com
