= Phanariots =

Greek nobility from Phanar, Constantinople

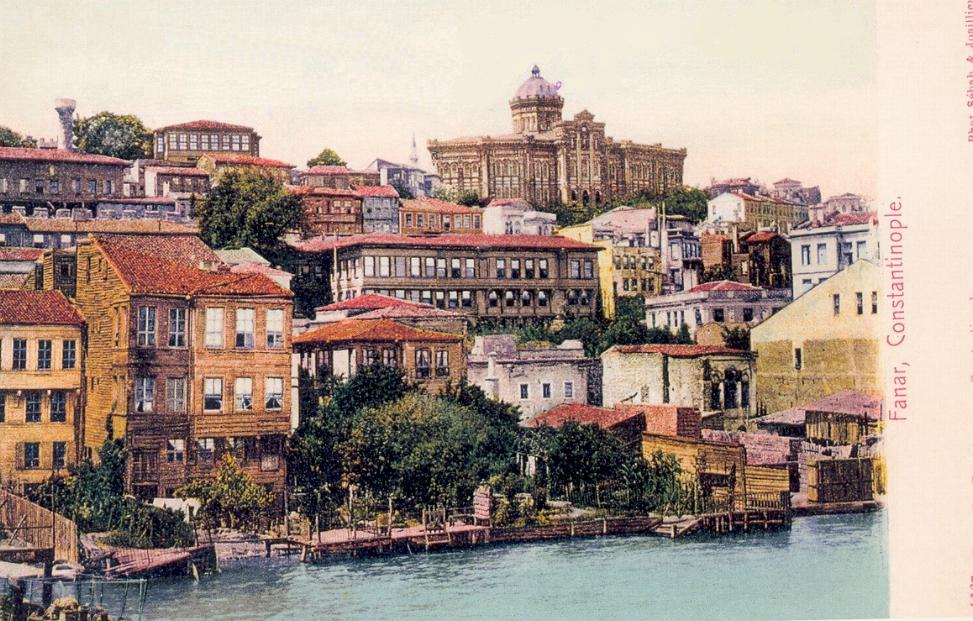
View of the Phanarion quarter, the historical centre of the Greek community of Constantinople in Ottoman times, c. 1900

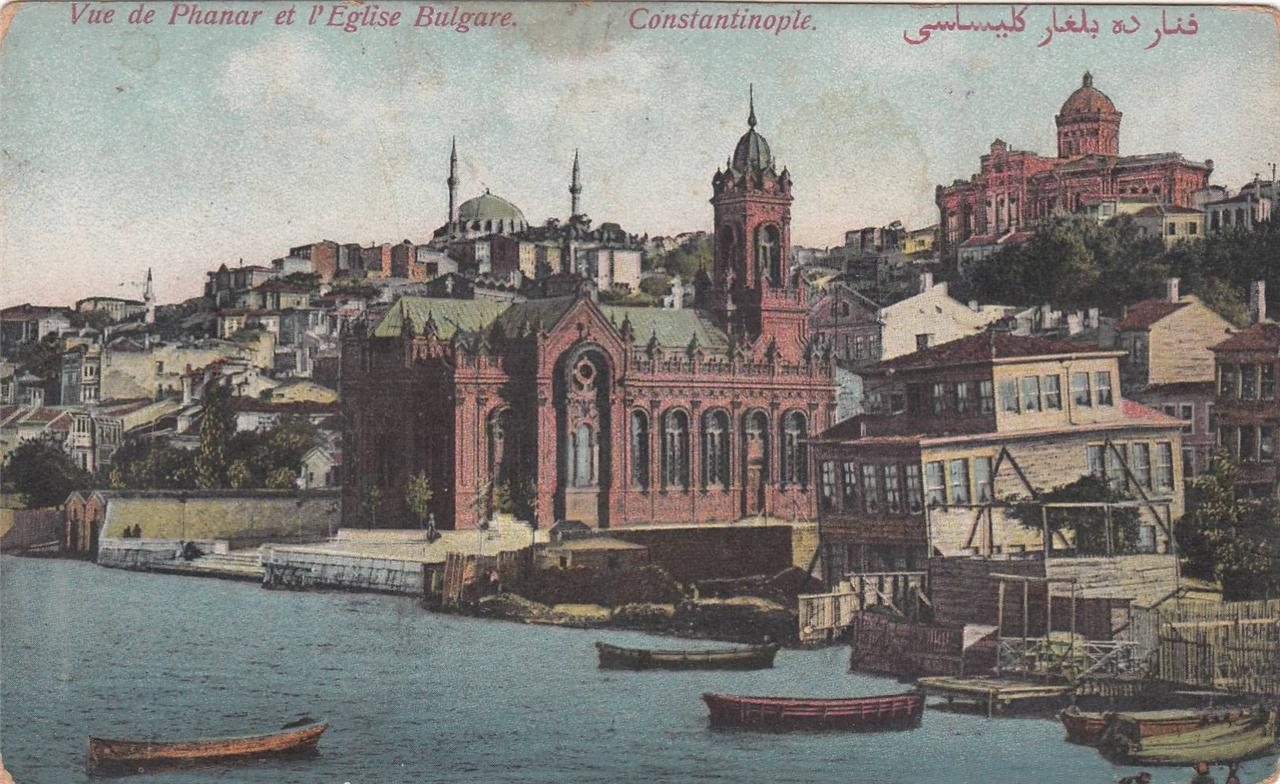
Another view of the Phanarion quarter, c. 1900. In the forefront: the Bulgarian Orthodox Church of St. Stephen; atop the hill: the Phanar Greek Orthodox College.

Phanariots, Phanariotes, or Fanariots (Greek: Φαναριώτες, Romanian: Fanarioți, Turkish: Fenerliler) were members of prominent Greek families in Phanar (Φανάρι, modern Fener), the chief Greek quarter of Constantinople where the Ecumenical Patriarchate is located, who traditionally occupied four important positions in the Ottoman Empire: Hospodar of Moldavia, Hospodar of Wallachia, Grand Dragoman of the Porte and Grand Dragoman of the Fleet. Despite their cosmopolitanism and often-Western education, the Phanariots were aware of their Greek ancestry and culture; according to Nicholas Mavrocordatos's Philotheou Parerga, "We are a race completely Hellenic".

They emerged as a class of wealthy Greek merchants (of mostly noble Byzantine descent) during the second half of the 16th century, and were influential in the administration of the Ottoman Empire's Balkan domains in the 18th century. The Phanariots usually built their houses in the Phanar quarter to be near the court of the Patriarch, who (under the Ottoman millet system) was recognized as the spiritual and secular head (millet-bashi) of the Orthodox subjects—the Rum Millet, or "Roman nation" of the empire, except those under the spiritual care of the Patriarchs of Antioch, Jerusalem, Alexandria, Ohrid and Peć—often acting as archontes of the Ecumenical See. They dominated the administration of the patriarchate, often intervening in the selection of hierarchs (including the Ecumenical Patriarch of Constantinople).

== Overview ==
Many members of Phanariot families (who had acquired great wealth and influence during the 17th century) occupied high political and administrative posts in the Ottoman Empire. From 1669 until the Greek War of Independence in 1821, Phanariots made up the majority of the dragomans to the Ottoman government (the Porte) and foreign embassies due to the Greeks' higher level of education than the general Ottoman population. With the church dignitaries, local notables from the provinces and the large Greek merchant class, Phanariots represented the better-educated members of Greek society during Ottoman rule until the 1821 start of the Greek War of Independence. During the war, Phanariots influenced decisions by the Greek National Assembly (the representative body of Greek revolutionaries, which met six times between 1821 and 1829). Between 1711–1716 and 1821, a number of Phanariots were appointed Hospodars (voivodes or princes) in the Danubian Principalities (Moldavia and Wallachia) (usually as a promotion from the offices of Dragoman of the Fleet and Dragoman of the Porte); the period is known as the Phanariot epoch in Romanian history.

== Ottoman Empire ==
After the fall of Constantinople, Mehmet II deported the city's Christian population, leaving only the Jewish inhabitants of Balat, repopulating the city with Christians and Muslims from throughout the whole empire and the newly conquered territories. Phanar was repopulated with Greeks from Mouchlion in the Peloponnese and, after 1461, with citizens of the Empire of Trebizond.

The roots of Greek ascendancy can be traced to the Ottoman need for skilled, educated negotiators as their empire declined and they relied on treaties rather than force. During the 17th century, the Ottomans began having problems in foreign relations and difficulty dictating terms to their neighbours; for the first time, the Porte needed to participate in diplomatic negotiations.

With the Ottomans traditionally ignoring Western European languages and cultures, officials were at a loss. The Porte assigned those tasks to the Greeks, who had a long mercantile and educational tradition and the necessary skills. The Phanariots and other Greek as well as Hellenized families primarily from Constantinople, occupied high posts as secretaries and interpreters for Ottoman officials.

=== Diplomats and patriarchs ===
As a result of Phanariot and ecclesiastical administration, the Greeks expanded their influence in the 18th-century empire while retaining their Greek Orthodox faith and Hellenism. This had not always been the case in the Ottoman realm. During the 16th century, the South Slavs—the most prominent in imperial affairs—converted to Islam to enjoy the full rights of Ottoman citizenship (especially in the Eyalet of Bosnia; Serbs tended to occupy high military positions.

A Slavic presence in Ottoman administration gradually became hazardous for its rulers, since the Slavs tended to support Habsburg armies during the Great Turkish War. By the 17th century the Greek Patriarch of Constantinople was the religious and administrative ruler of the empire's Orthodox subjects, regardless of ethnic background. All formerly-independent Orthodox patriarchates, including the Serbian Patriarchate renewed in 1557, came under the authority of the Greek Orthodox Church. Most of the Greek patriarchs were drawn from the Phanariots.

Two Greek social groups emerged, challenging the leadership of the Greek Church: the Phanariots in Constantinople and the local notables in the Helladic provinces (kodjabashis, dimogerontes and prokritoi). According to 19th-century Greek historian Constantine Paparrigopoulos, the Phanariots initially sought the most important secular offices of the patriarchal court and could frequently intervene in the election of bishops and influence crucial decisions by the patriarch. Greek merchants and clergy of Byzantine aristocratic origin, who acquired economic and political influence and were later known as Phanariots, settled in extreme northwestern Constantinople (which had become central to Greek interests after the establishment of the patriarch's headquarters in 1461, shortly after Hagia Sophia was converted into a mosque).

Emblem of the Ecumenical Patriarch of Constantinople

==== Patriarchate ====
After the 1453 fall of Constantinople, when the Sultan replaced de jure the Byzantine Emperor for subjugated Christians, he recognized the Ecumenical Patriarch as the religious and national leader (ethnarch) of the Greeks and other ethnic groups in the Greek Orthodox Millet. The Patriarchate had primary importance, occupying this key role for Christians of the Empire because the Ottomans did not legally distinguish between nationality and religion and considered the empire's Orthodox Christians a single entity.

The position of the Patriarchate in the Ottoman state encouraged Greek renaissance projects centering on the resurrection and revitalization of the Byzantine Empire. The Patriarch and his church dignitaries constituted the first centre of power for the Greeks in the Ottoman state, which infiltrated Ottoman structures and attracted the former Byzantine nobility.

=== Merchant middle class ===
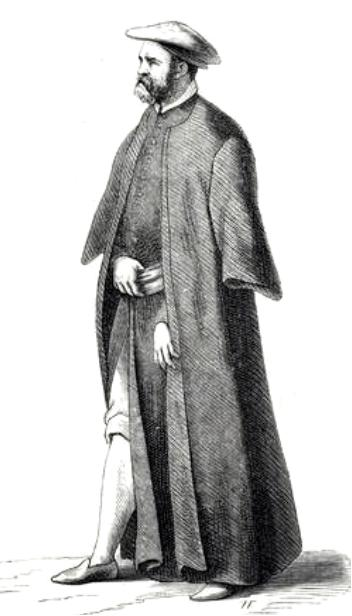
Engraving of Greek merchant by Cesare Vecellio (16th century)

The wealth of the extensive Greek merchant class provided the material basis for the intellectual revival featured in Greek life for more than half a century before 1821. Greek merchants endowed libraries and schools. On the eve of the Greek War of Independence, the three most important centres of Greek learning (schools-cum-universities) were in the commercial centres of Chios, Smyrna and Aivali. The first Greek millionaire of the Ottoman era was Michael "Şeytanoğlu" Kantakouzenos, who earned 60,000 ducats a year from his control of the fur trade from Muscovy.

=== Civil servants ===
During the 18th century, the Phanariots were a hereditary clerical−aristocratic group who managed the affairs of the patriarchate and the dominant political power of the Ottoman Greek community. They became a significant political factor in the empire and, as diplomatic agents, played a role in the affairs of Great Britain, France and the Russian Empire.

The Phanariots competed for the most important administrative offices in the Ottoman administration; these included collecting imperial taxes, monopolies on commerce, working under contract in a number of enterprises, supplying the court and ruling the Danubian Principalities. They engaged in private trade, controlling the crucial wheat trade on the Black Sea. The Phanariots expanded their commercial activities into the Kingdom of Hungary and then to the other Central European states. Their activities intensified their contacts with Western nations, and they became familiar with Western languages and cultures.

Before the beginning of the Greek War of Independence, the Phanariots were firmly established as the political elite of Hellenism. According to Greek historian Constantine Paparrigopoulos, this was a natural evolution given the Phanariots' education and experience in supervising large parts of the empire. According to Nikos Svoronos argued, the Phanariots subordinated their national identity to their class identity and tried to peacefully co−exist with the Ottomans; they did not enrich the Greek national identity and lost ground to groups which flourished through their confrontation with the Ottoman Empire (the klephts and armatoloi).

== Danubian Principalities ==
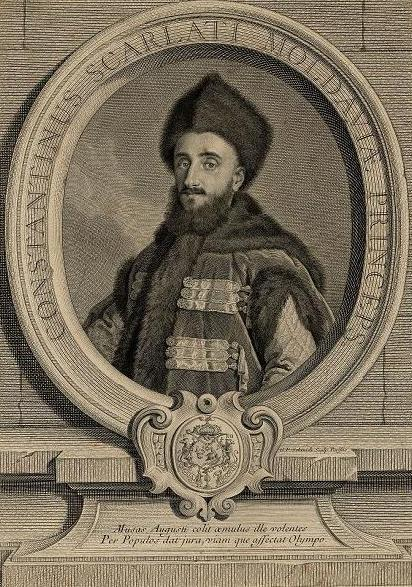
Constantine Mavrocordatos, engraving from 1763

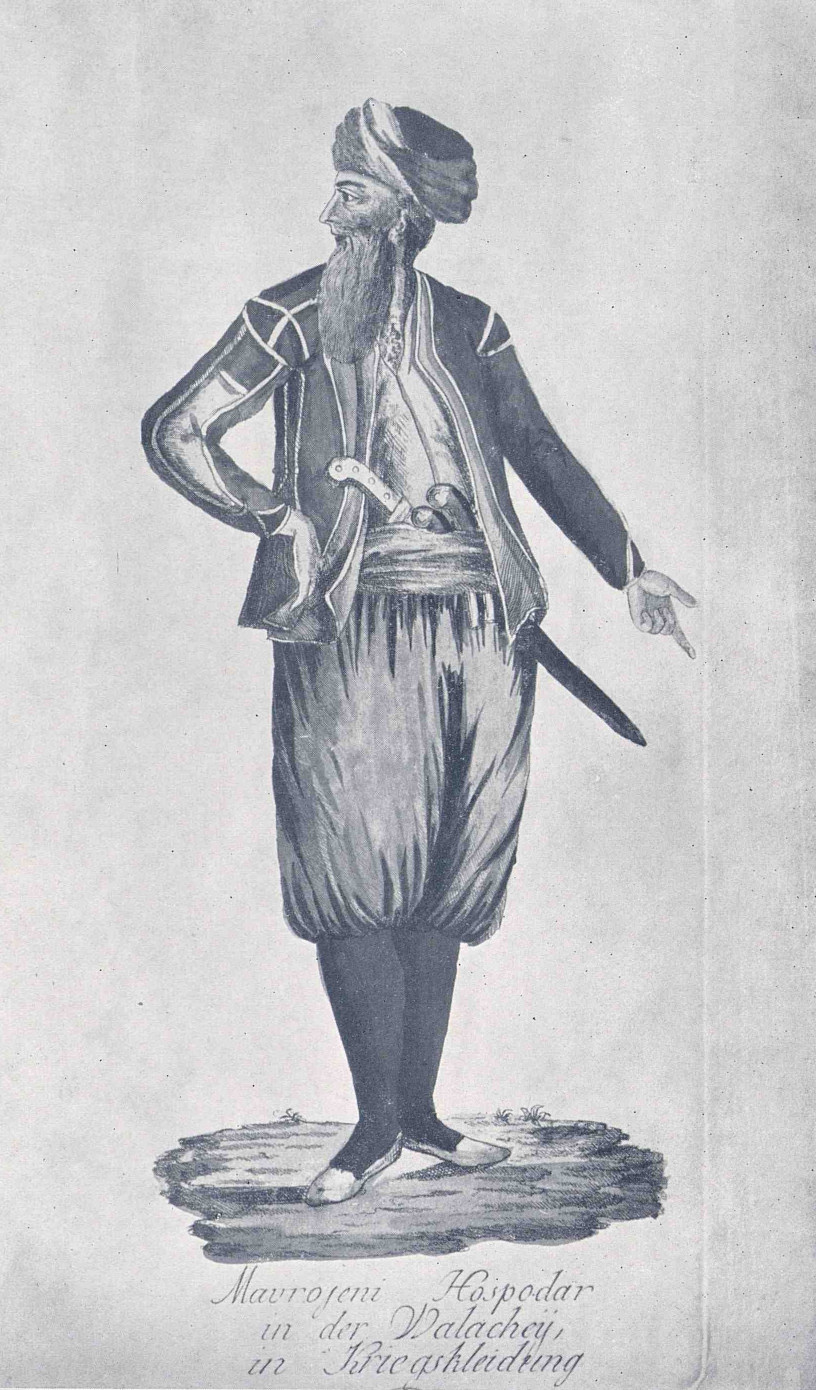
Nicholas Mavrogheni, Hospodar of Wallachia, in war attire; German engraving, ca. 1790

A Greek presence had established itself in both Danubian Principalities of Moldavia and Wallachia, resulting in the appointment of Greek princes before the 18th century. After the Phanariot era, some Phanariot families in Wallachia and Moldavia identified themselves as Romanian in Romanian society (including the Rosetti family; C. A. Rosetti represented the radical, nationalist cause during and after the 1848 Wallachian revolution.).

Phanariot attention focused on occupying the most favorable offices the empire could offer non-Muslims and the principalities of Moldavia and Wallachia, which were still relatively rich and—more importantly—autonomous (despite having to pay tribute as vassal states). Many Greeks had found favorable conditions there for commercial activities, in comparison with the Ottoman Empire, and an opportunity for political power; they entered Wallachian and Moldavian boyar nobility by marriage.

Reigns of local princes were not excluded on principle. Several hellenized Romanian noble families, such as the Callimachis (originally Călmașul), the Racovițăs and the Albanian Ghicas penetrated the Phanar nucleus to increase their chances of occupying the thrones and maintain their positions.

Most sources agree that 1711 was when the gradual erosion of traditional institutions reached its zenith, but characteristics ascribed to the Phanariot era had made themselves felt long before it. The Ottomans enforced their choice of hospodars as far back as the 15th century, and foreign (usually Greek or Levantine) boyars competed with local ones since the late 16th century. Rulers since Dumitraşcu Cantacuzino in Moldavia and George Ducas (a prince of Greek origin) in Wallachia, both in 1673, were forced to surrender their family members as hostages in Constantinople. The traditional elective system in the principalities, resulting in long periods of political disorder, was dominated by a small number of ambitious families who competed violently for the two thrones and monopolized land ownership.

=== 1711–1715 ===
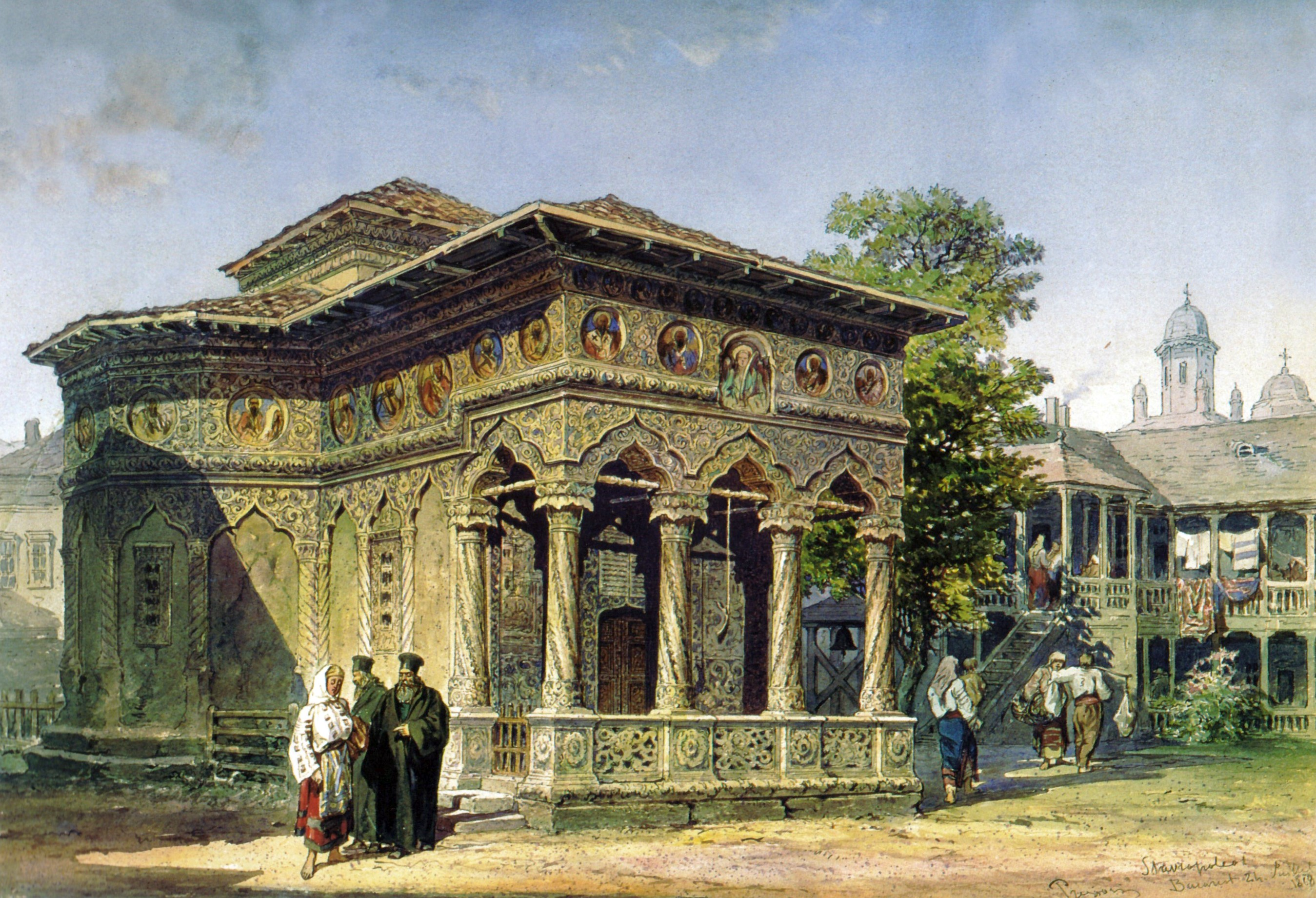
Stavropoleos Church, built in Bucharest by Nicholas Mavrocordatos, in an 1868 lithograph by Amedeo Preziosi

A change in policy was indicated by the fact that autonomous Wallachia and Moldavia had entered a period of skirmishes with the Ottomans, due to the insubordination of local princes associated with the rise of Imperial Russia's power under Peter the Great and the firm presence of the Habsburg Empire on the Carpathian border with the principalities. Dissidence in the two countries became dangerous for the Turks, who were confronted with the attraction on the population of protection by a fellow Eastern Orthodox state. This became obvious with Mihai Racoviță's second rule in Moldavia, when the prince plotted with Peter to have Ottoman rule overthrown. His replacement, Nicholas Mavrocordatos, was the first official Phanariot in his second reign in Moldavia and replaced Ștefan Cantacuzino in Wallachia as the first Phanariot ruler of that country.

A crucial moment was the Russo−Turkish War of 1710−1713, when Dimitrie Cantemir sided with Russia and agreed to Russian tutelage of his country. After Russia experienced a major defeat and Cantemir went into exile, the Ottomans took charge of the succession to the throne of Moldavia. This was followed by similar measures in Wallachia, prompted by Ștefan Cantacuzino's alliance with Habsburg commander Prince Eugene of Savoy in the closing stages of the Great Turkish War.

=== Rulers and retinues ===
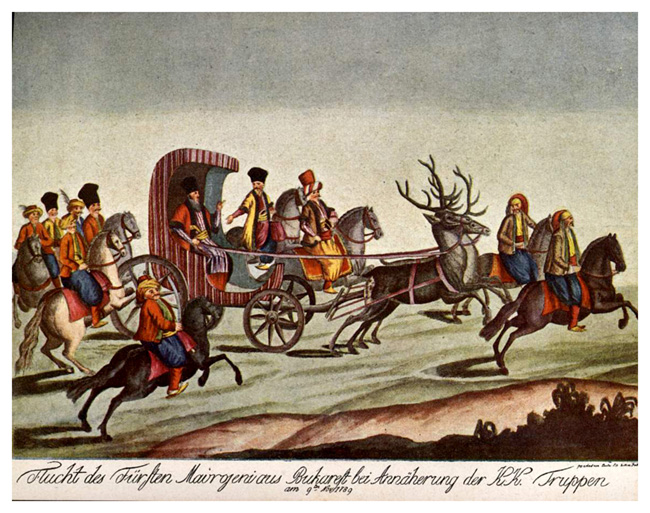
Phanariots in Wallachia. The caption reads: "Flight of Prince Mavrogeni from Bucharest while k.u.k. troops approach / 9 Nov[ember] 1789".

The person raised to the office of prince was usually the chief dragoman of the Porte, well-versed in contemporary politics and Ottoman statecraft. The new prince, who obtained his office in exchange for a generous bribe, proceeded to the country he was selected to govern (whose language he usually did not know). When the new princes were appointed, they were escorted to Iași or Bucharest by retinues composed of their families, favourites and creditors (from whom they had borrowed the bribes). The prince and his appointees counted on recouping these in as short a time as possible, amassing an amount sufficient to live on after their brief time in office.

Thirty-one princes, from eleven families, ruled the two principalities during the Phanariot epoch. When the choice became limited to a few families due to princely disloyalty to the Porte, rulers would be moved from one principality to the other; the prince of Wallachia (the richer of the two principalities) would pay to avert his transfer to Iaşi, and the prince of Moldavia would bribe supporters in Constantinople to appoint him to Wallachia. Constantine Mavrocordatos ruled a total of ten times in Moldavia and Wallachia. The debt was owed to several creditors, rather than to the Sultan; the central institutions of the Ottoman Empire generally seemed determined to maintain their rule over the principalities and not exploit them irrationally. In an early example, Ahmed III paid part of Nicholas Mavrocordatos' sum.

=== Administration and boyars ===
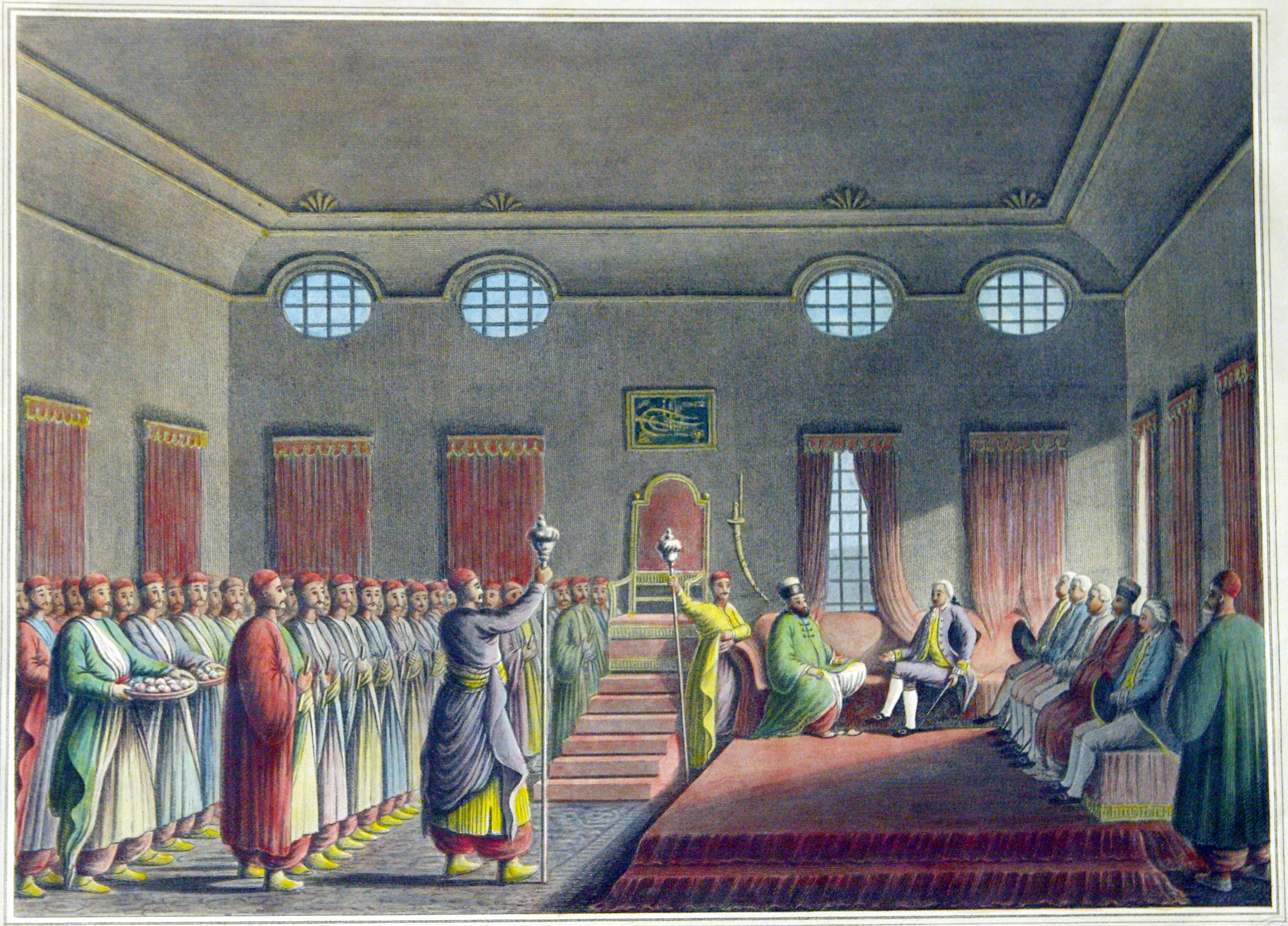
Alexander Mourousis welcoming the British ambassador in Curtea Nouă

The Phanariot epoch was initially characterized by fiscal policies driven by Ottoman needs and the ambitions of some hospodars, who (mindful of their fragile status) sought to pay back their creditors and increase their wealth while in a position of power. To make the reigns lucrative while raising funds to satisfy the needs of the Porte, princes channeled their energies into taxing the inhabitants into destitution. The most odious taxes (such as the văcărit first imposed by Iancu Sasul in the 1580s), mistakenly identified with the Phanariots in modern Romanian historiography, were much older.

The mismanagement of many Phanariot rulers contrasts with the achievements and projects of others, such as Constantine Mavrocordatos (who abolished serfdom in Wallachia in 1746 and Moldavia in 1749) and Alexander Ypsilantis, who were inspired by Habsburg serf policy. Ypsilantis tried to reform legislation and impose salaries for administrative offices in an effort to halt the depletion of funds the administrators, local and Greek alike, were using for their own maintenance; it was, by then, more profitable to hold office than to own land. His Pravilniceasca condică, a relatively modern legal code, met stiff boyar resistance.

The focus of such rules was often the improvement of state structure against conservative wishes. Contemporary documents indicate that, despite the change in leadership and boyar complaints, about 80 percent of those seated in the Divan (an institution roughly equivalent to the estates of the realm) were members of local families. This made endemic the social and economic issues of previous periods, since the inner circle of boyars blocked initiatives (such as Alexander Ypsilantis') and obtained, extended and preserved tax exemptions.

== Russian influence ==
The Phanariots copied Russian and Habsburg institutions; during the mid-18th century they made noble rank dependent on state service, as Peter I of Russia did. After the Treaty of Kuchuk-Kainarji (1774) allowed Russia to intervene on the side of Ottoman Eastern Orthodox subjects, most of the Porte's tools of political pressure became ineffective. They had to offer concessions to maintain a hold on the countries as economic and strategic assets. The treaty made any increase in tribute impossible, and between 1774 and the 1820s it plummeted from about 50,000 to 20,000 gold coins (equivalent to Austrian gold currency) in Wallachia and to 3,100 in Moldavia.

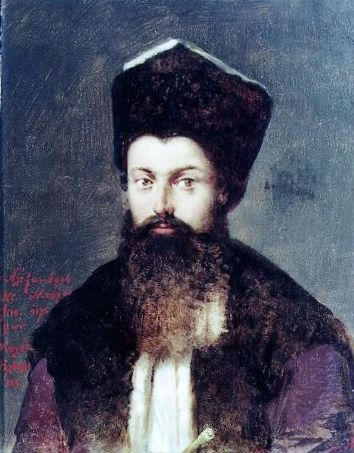
Alexander Mourousis

Immediately afterward, Russia forcefully used its new prerogative. The deposition of Constantine Ypsilantis (in Wallachia) and Alexander Mourousis (in Moldavia) by Selim III, called on by French Empire's ambassador to the Ottoman Empire Horace Sébastiani (whose fears of pro−Russian conspiracies in Bucharest were partially confirmed), was the casus belli for the 1806–1812 conflict, and Russian general Mikhail Andreyevich Miloradovich swiftly reinstated Ypsilantis during his military expedition to Wallachia.

Such gestures began a period of effective Russian supervision, culminating with the Organic Statute administration of the 1830s. The Danubian principalities grew in strategic importance with the Napoleonic Wars and the decline of the Ottoman Empire, as European states became interested in halting Russian southward expansion (which included the 1812 annexation of Bessarabia). New consulates in the two countries' capitals, ensuring the observation of developments in Russian−Ottoman relations, had an indirect impact on the local economy as rival diplomats began awarding protection and sudit status to merchants competing with local guilds. Nicholas I of Russia pressured Wallachia and Moldavia into granting constitutions (in 1831 and 1832, respectively) to weaken native rulers.

The boyars began a petition campaign against the princes in power; addressed to the Porte and the Habsburg monarchy, they primarily demanded Russian supervision. Although they referred to incidents of corruption and misrule, the petitions indicate their signers' conservatism. The boyars tend to refer to (fictitious) "capitulations" which either principality would have signed with the Ottomans, demanding that rights guaranteed through them be restored. They viewed reform attempts by princes as illegitimate; in alternative proposals (usually in the form of constitutional projects), the boyars expressed desire for an aristocratic republic.

== Greek War of Independence and legacy ==
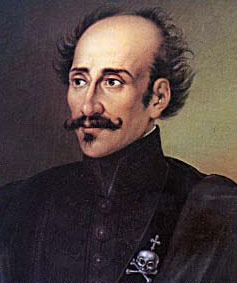
Alexandros Ypsilantis (1792–1828), prince of the Danubian Principalities, senior Imperial Russian cavalry officer during the Napoleonic Wars and leader of the Filiki Eteria, commanded the Greek Revolution in Wallachia and planned a pan-Balkan uprising.

The active part taken by Greek princes in revolts after 1820 and the disorder provoked by the Filiki Eteria (of which the Ghica, Văcărescu and Golescu families were active members after its uprising against the Ottoman Empire in Moldavia and Tudor Vladimirescu's Wallachian uprising) led to the disappearance of promotions from the Phanar community; the Greeks were no longer trusted by the Porte. Amid tense relations between boyars and princes, Vladimirescu's revolt was primarily the result of compromise between Oltenian pandurs and the regency of boyars attempting to block the ascension of Scarlat Callimachi (the last Phanariot ruler in Bucharest). Ioan Sturdza's rule in Moldavia and Grigore IV Ghica's in Wallachia are considered the first of the new period, although the new regime abruptly ended in Russian occupation during another Russo−Turkish War and the subsequent period of Russian influence.

Most Phanariots were patrons of Greek culture, education and printing. They founded academies which attracted teachers and pupils from throughout the Orthodox commonwealth, and there was awareness of intellectual trends in Habsburg Europe. Many of the Phanariot princes were capable, farsighted rulers. As prince of Wallachia in 1746 and Moldavia in 1749, Constantine Mavrocordatos abolished serfdom and Alexander Ypsilantis of Wallachia (reigned 1774–1782) initiated extensive administrative and legal reforms. Ipsilanti's reign coincided with subtle shifts in economic and social life and the emergence of spiritual and intellectual aspirations which pointed to the West and reform.

Condemnation of the Phanariots is a focus of Romanian nationalism, usually integrated into a general resentment of foreigners. The tendency unifies pro− and anti−modernisation attitudes; Phanariot Greeks are painted as reactionary elements (by Communist Romania) and agents of brutal, opportunistic change (as in Mihai Eminescu's Scrisoarea a III-a).

== Neo-Phanariots ==
The term Neo-Phanariots is sometimes used to describe the Greek families of Constantinople that rose to prominence in the 19th century, after the Greek War of Independence, such as the Aristarchis, the Karatheodoris, or the Mousouros. Supporting the Ottomanist doctrine, they occupied various high-ranking positions within the Ottoman bureaucracy (such as the Prince of Samos) and diplomacy.

== Extant Phanariot families ==
Ghica family coat of arms

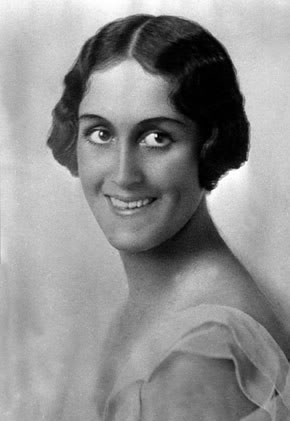
Aspasia Manos (1896–1972), wife of Alexander I of Greece

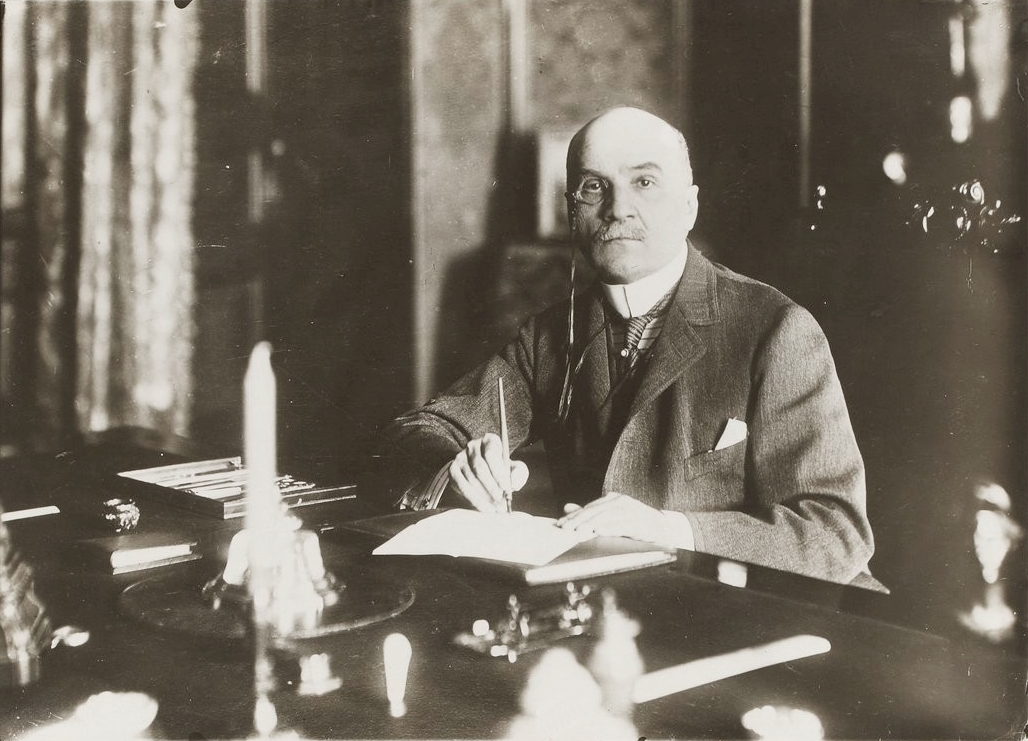
Maurice Paléologue (1859–1944), diplomat, historian and essayist

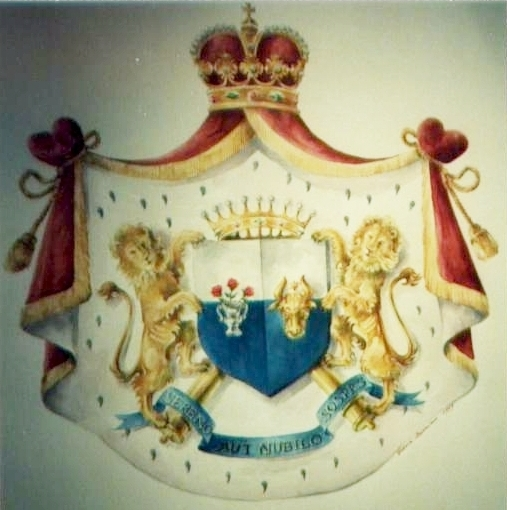
Rosetti family coat of arms

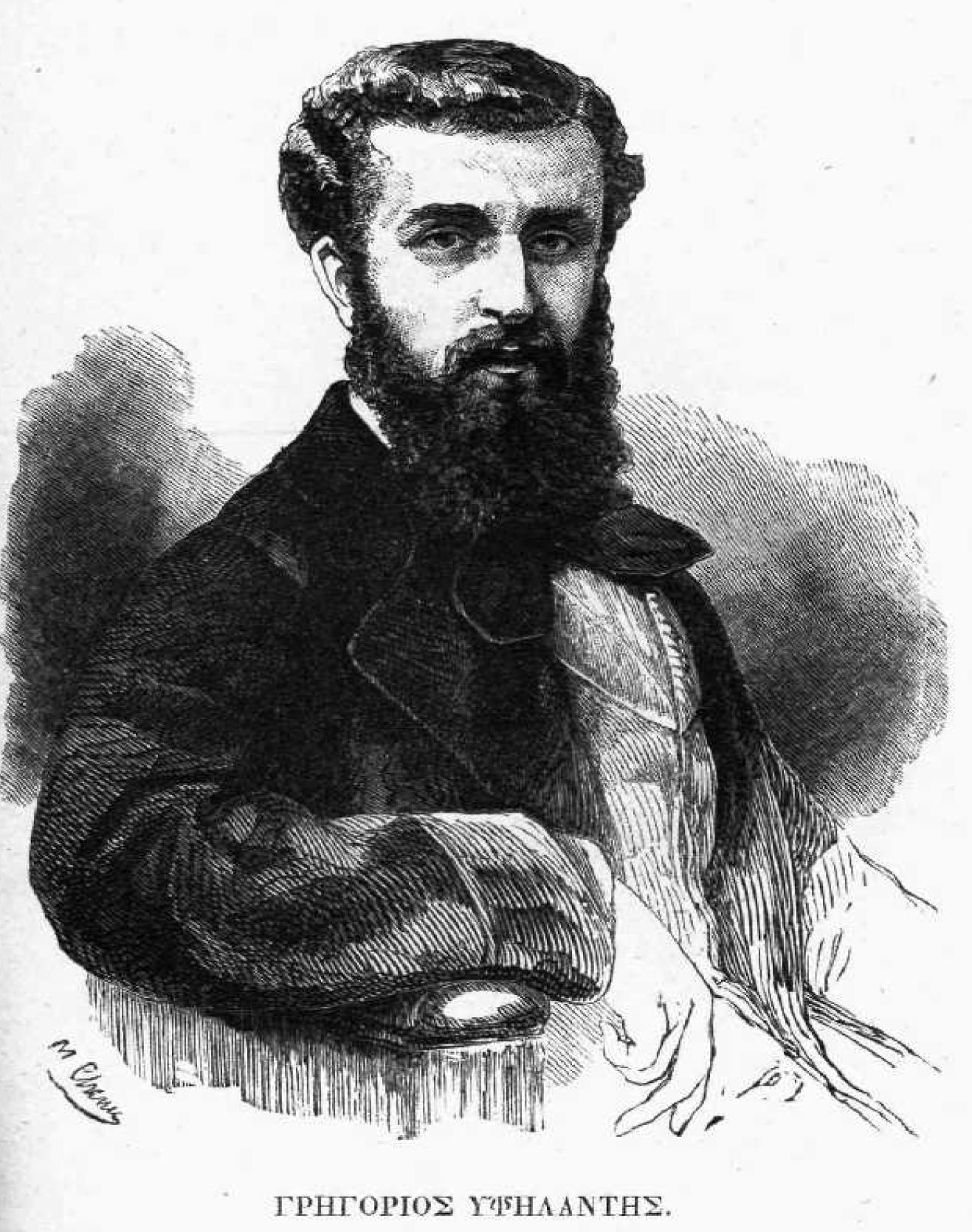
Grigorios Ypsilantis (1835–1886), Greek diplomat

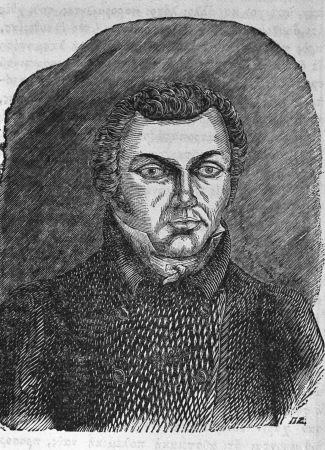
Stefanos Kanellos (1792–1823), revolutionary and scholar of the Greek Enlightenment

Here is a non-exhaustive list of Phanariot families:

- Angelos, imperial family originally from central Philadelphia, Byzantine emperors.
- Argyropoulos, noble family of the Byzantine Empire also known as Argyros, see John Argyropoulos.
- Athanasovici
- Callimachi family, also known as Călmașu, Kalmaşu or Kallimaşu, originally a Romanian boyar family from Moldavia.
- Callivazis, originally from Trebizond, relocated to the Russian Empire.
- Cantacuzino, claimed to be originated from the Byzantine noble family Kantakouzenos.
- Caradjas, also known as Caragea or Karatzas.
- Caratheodoris family, see also Constantin Carathéodory
- Cariophyllis
- Chrisoscoleos
- Chrisovergis, also known as Hrisovergis, from the Peloponnese
- Caravia family, noble family from the Ionian Islands, a branch of the Byzantine Kallergi House
- Catacazi
- Conachi family, also known as Konaki, a boyar family from Moldavia.
- Diamandis
- Doukas, also known as Dukas, imperial family originally from Paphlagonia, Despotate of Epirus despots.
- Evalidis, also known as Evaoglous, Hadjievalidis, from Trebizond
- Gerakis, from Kefalonia
- Geralis, from Mytilene and Kefalonia
- Ghica family, originally Albanians from Macedonia
- Hantzeris, also known as Handjeri, Hançeri, Pıçakçı and Hançeroglou, see Constantine Hangerli
- Hurmuzachi
- Kanellos, also known as Kanellou or Canello, originally from Chios (see Stefanos Kanellos)
- Kavadas, from Chios
- Komnenos, also known as Komnenus or Comnenos, including its cadet branches of Axouch, Axouchos or Afouxechos, from Trebizond, Byzantine and Trebizond emperors.
- Lahovary
- Lambrinos
- Lapithis, from Crete
- Lazaridis, also known as Lazarević, a Serbianized family originally from Montenegro.
- Levidis officials on the Patriarchate and dignitaries in the Imperial Court (Sublime Porte).
- Mamonas
- Manos, originated from Kastoria, see Aspasia Manos
- Mavrocordatos, from Chios, see Alexandros Mavrokordatos.
- Mavrogenis, from Paros, see Manto Mavrogenous.
- Mavroudis
- Mourouzis family, see Alexander Mourouzis
- Musurus, see Marcus Musurus
- Negris
- Palaiologos, imperial family originally from central Asia minor, later marquesses of Montferrat
- Photeinos
- Philanthropenos, noble family of the Byzantine Empire.
- Rallis, from Chios, later a political family in the Hellenic Republic.
- Rizos Rangavis, see Alexandros Rizos Rangavis
- Racoviță, also known as Racovitza, Romanian noble family from Moldavia and Wallachia.
- Ramalo
- Rodocanachi
- Romalo
- Rosetti family, also known as Ruset or Russeti, Moldavian Boyar family of Byzantine and Genoan origins.
- Scanavis
- Schinas
- Sekiaris, noble family from Chios
- Sereslis
- Soutzos family, also known as Suțu, Sutzu or Sütçü, see Michael Soutzos.
- Tzanavarakis, also known Tzanavaris, Çanavaris or Canavaroğulları.
- Venturas
- Vlachoutzis
- Văcărescu family, Romanian boyars from Wallachia and the first poets in Romanian literature
- Vlastos, from Crete
- Ypsilantis, from Trebizond, see Alexander Ypsilantis and Demetrios Ypsilantis

== Extinct Phanariot families ==
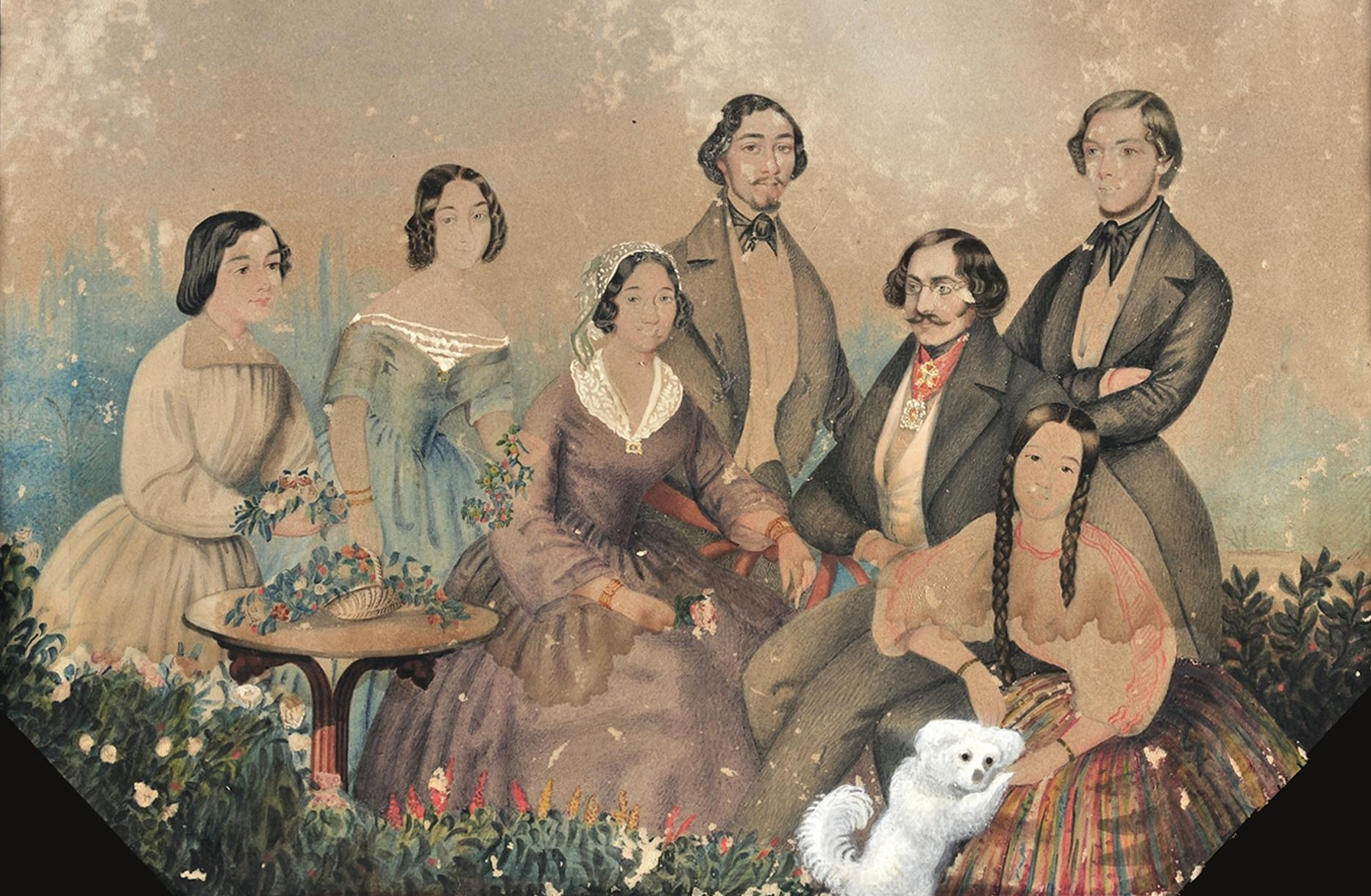
19th-century portrait of the Phanariot Greek Mavrocordatos family.

- Aristarchis
- Ballasakis
- Cananos
- Caryophyles
- Dimakis
- Eupragiotes
- Iancoleos (della Rocca)
- Moronas
- Negris
- Paladas, from Crete
- Plaginos
- Rizos Neroulos
- Ramadan
- Souldjaroglou
- Tzoukes

== See also ==
- Ottoman Greeks
- Diafotismos
- Greeks in Romania
- Bulgarian Exarchate
- Early modern Romania
- Danubian Principalities
- List of rulers of Moldavia
- List of rulers of Wallachia
- Russo-Turkish wars
- State organisation of the Ottoman Empire
