= Alexander Ypsilantis (1725–1805) =

Greek Voivode of Wallachia and Moldavia

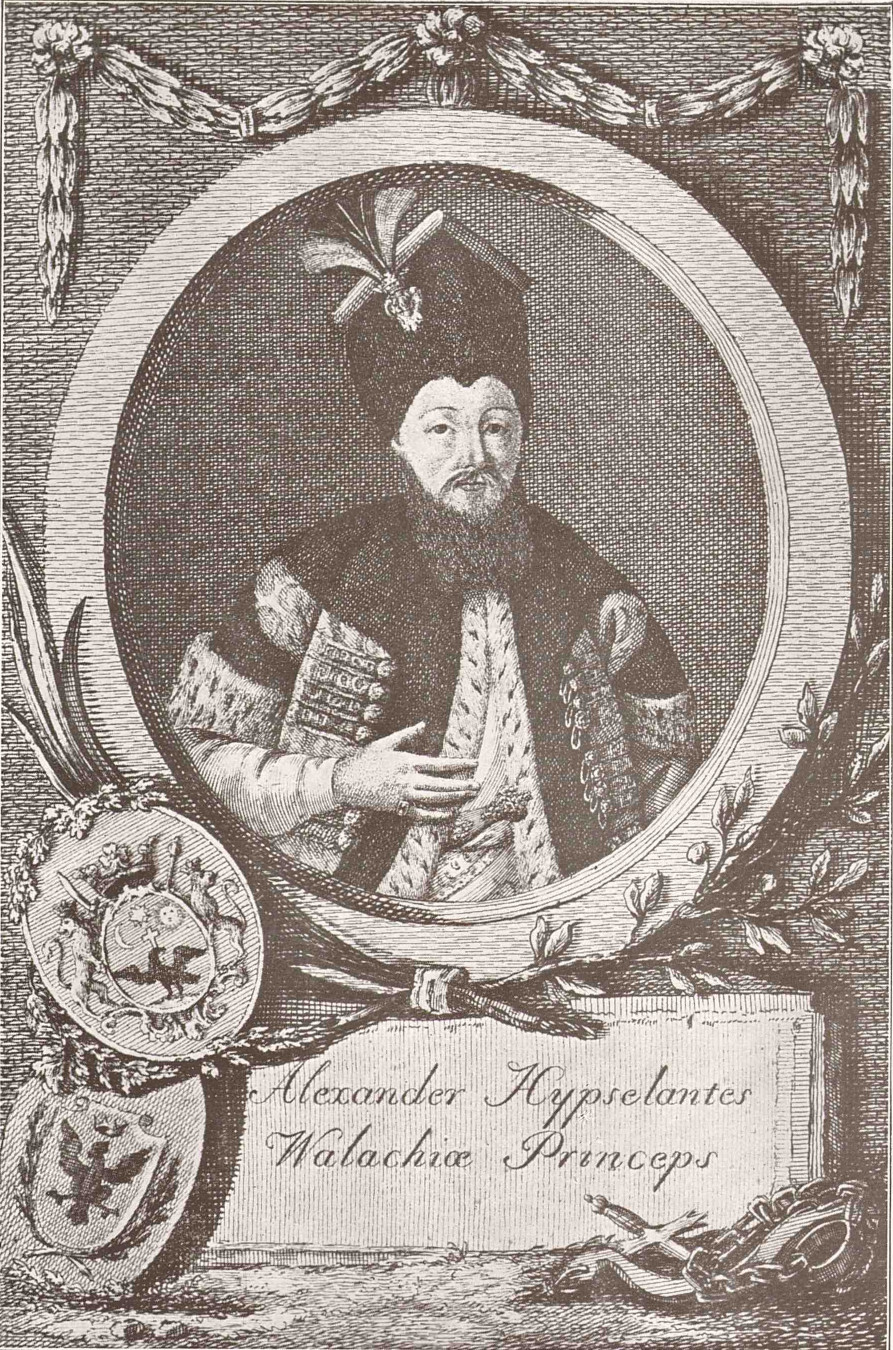

Prince of Wallachia (1st reign)
- Reign: 15 September 1774 – February 1782
- Predecessor: Emanuel Giani Ruset
- Successor: Nicholas Caradja

Prince of Moldavia
- Reign: December 1786 – 19 April 1788
- Predecessor: Alexander Mavrocordatos Firaris
- Successor: Emanuel Giani Ruset

Prince of Wallachia (2nd reign)
- Reign: August 1796 – December 1797
- Predecessor: Alexander Mourouzis
- Successor: Constantine Hangerli
- Born: 1726; Constantinople, Ottoman Empire (modern-day Istanbul, Turkey)
- Died: 13 January 1807 (aged 80–81); Constantinople, Ottoman Empire (modern-day Istanbul, Turkey)
- Issue: Constantine Ypsilantis
- House: Ypsilantis
- Religion: Orthodox

Alexander Ypsilantis (Greek: Αλέξανδρος Υψηλάντης Alexandros Ypsilantis, Romanian: Alexandru Ipsilanti; 1726 – 13 January 1807) was a Greek Voivode (Prince) of Wallachia from 1774 to 1782, and again from 1796 to 1797, and also Voivode of Moldavia from 1786 to 1788. He bears the same name as, but should not be confused with, his grandson, the Greek War of Independence hero of the early 19th century. The Ypsilantis were a prominent family of Phanariotes.

== Reign ==
In 1774, as a diplomat in service to the Porte, Ypsilanti took part in the signing of the Treaty of Kuchuk-Kainarji with Russia; a year later, he was rewarded for this and other services by being appointed Dragoman of the Porte. Still in 1775, he was awarded the throne of Wallachia. This could only happen as the Russian troops were ending their occupation of Bucharest, begun in 1771. The throne had been vacant throughout this period, a hiatus provoked by Emanuel Giani Ruset's agreement with Catherine II at the start of the war.

As principal acts of his reign in Wallachia, Ypsilanti enforced a series of reforms. Several laws are grouped in the Pravilniceasca condică, called "Syntagmation nomikon" in its Greek version (roughly: "The Code of Byzantine customary laws"). Issued in 1780, the Code sought to amend fiscal, administrative, judicial and political flaws. During his judicial reform, Ypsilanti created civil courts in each Wallachian county. What was in fact a radical redefinition of legal boundaries had to make occasional reference to Byzantine norms (the traditional laws in the two Principalities), due to resistance from conservative boyars in the Assembly (the Sfat). Most notably, the new laws tried to impose salaries for public offices, a measure intended to reduce fiscal burdens on the taxed social categories (that had been supposed to provide revenues for the fiscal agents, usually boyars, in an economy in which land ownership had become less of an asset than holding office) and ensure a more professional administrative structure.

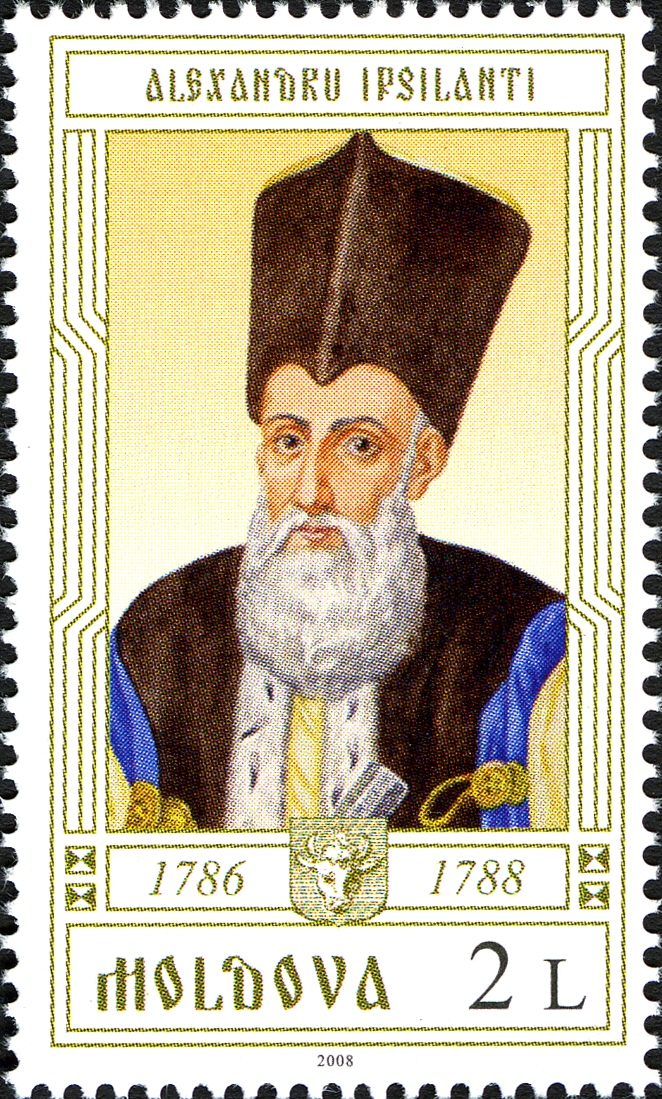
Alexander Ypsilantis on a stamp of Moldova

Ypsilanti's reigns coincide with a critical moment in Ottoman history. In August 1787, Russia resumed hostilities (see Russo-Turkish War (1787–1792)), and the Porte faced a large-scale invasion of its Danubian territories as the Habsburg Empire joined the fighting (9 February 1788). A secondary effect of this event was the granting of military command over Turkish troops in the region to Ypsilanti: the gesture is also significant as a temporary re-shaping of status in the relations between Prince and Sultan for the context of Phanariote rule.

Sources suggest that Ypsilanti was considering an alliance with Austria, and had been negotiating with emissaries of Emperor Joseph II. However, as the Austrians occupied Iaşi in April, all contacts ceased and the Prince was kept in custody in Brno up to the signing of the peace treaty at Sistowa (autumn of 1791).

== See also ==
- Constantine Ypsilantis – son
- Alexander Ypsilantis – grandson
- Demetrios Ypsilantis – grandson

Preceded by Scarlat Caradja	Grand Dragoman of the Porte; 1774	Succeeded by Constantine Mourousis
Preceded by Emanuel Giani Ruset	Prince of Wallachia; 1774–1782	Succeeded by Nicolae Caradja
Preceded by Alexandru Moruzi	Prince of Wallachia; 1796–1797	Succeeded by Constantin Hangerli
Preceded by Alexandru Mavrocordat	Prince/Voivode of Moldavia; 1786–1788	Succeeded by Austrian occupation
