= Stefanos Kanellos =

Greek scholar and revolutionary

- Στέφανος Κανέλλος
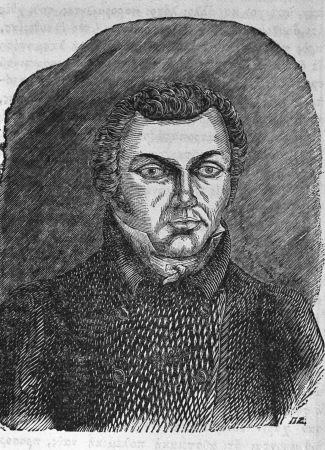
- Drawing of Stefanos Kanellos in a magazine of 1853
- Born: 1792; Constantinople, Ottoman Empire (now Istanbul, Turkey)
- Died: 1823 (aged 30 or 31); Crete
- Citizenship: Ottoman Empire; Greek

Academic background
- Education: Princely Academy of Bucharest
- Academic advisor: Constantinos Vardalachos

Academic work
- Era: Modern Greek Enlightenment
- Notable works: Hermes o Logios (as contributor)

Stefanos Kanellos (Greek: Στέφανος Κανέλλος; romanized: Stéfanos Kanéllos) was a Greek scholar, revolutionary and member of the Filiki Eteria of the early 19th century.

== Biography ==
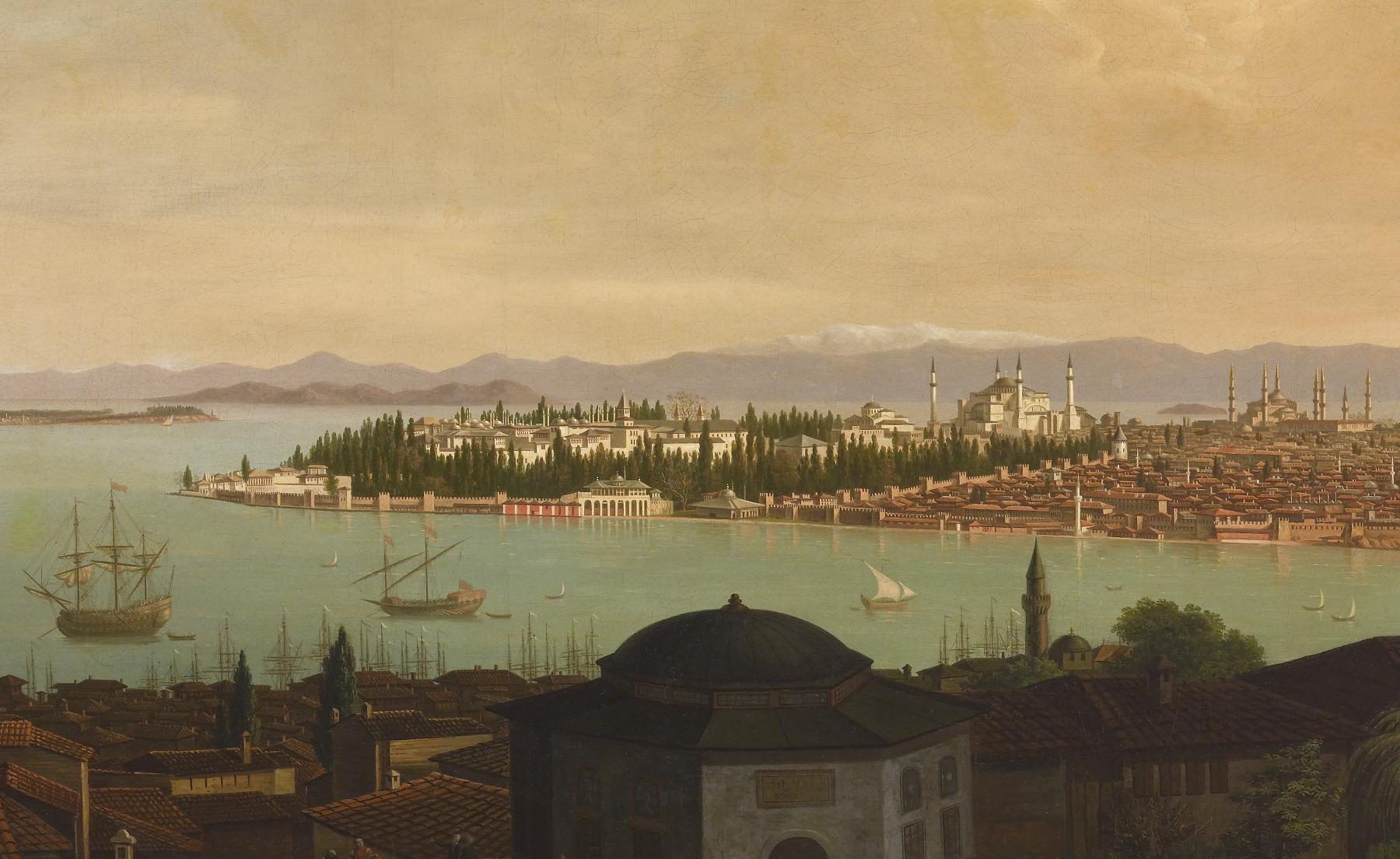
Panorama of Constantinople (Istanbul), by Antoine de Favray (1706-1798).

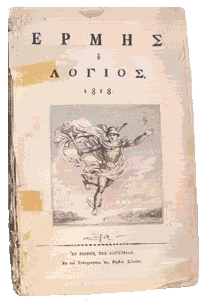
Hermes o Logios, Greek periodical printed in Vienna from 1811 to 1821.

He was born in 1792 in Constantinople, then Ottoman Empire (now Istanbul, Turkey). He studied science and taught mathematics and natural history at the Princely Academy of Bucharest, then run by Constantinos Vardalachos. When the Revolution broke out, Kanellos abandoned teaching and fought in the army of Alexander Ypsilantis near Danube. Among others he took the responsibility of the presentation of the positions of the movement of Ypsilantis to the monarchs of the Russian Empire and Germany. After the failure of the movement, he fled to Paris but soon returned to Greece to take part in the revolution. In May 1823 he accompanied Emmanouil Tombazis to Crete, who had been appointed by the Provisional Government to the island. His contribution to the formation of the island's administrative organization, which also aimed at normalizing relations between the rival groups of the Cretan chieftains, was valuable.

One of the main contributors of the Hermes o Logios (Vienna 1811-1821) in which he published with Athanasios Bogoridis issues in particular on natural sciences. In this sector, he translated into Greek scientific treatises of French and German scientists. He also published book reviews and articles on philosophical issues with Bogoridis. Finally, he was also the author and composer of Greek patriotic poems like "Paidiá ton Ellínon ti kartereíte" (Παιδιά των Ελλήνων τι καρτερείτε) and "Ta Palikária ta kalá den kléptoun, den arpázoun" (Τα παληκάρια τα καλά δεν κλέπτουν, δεν αρπάζουν).

He died in 1823 from an infectious disease in Crete.

== Sources ==
- Εγκυκλοπαίδεια Πάπυρος Λαρούς Μπριτάννικα, τ.27
- Βακάλης Χρήστος (2007) Ο Ελληνισμός της Ρουμανίας τον 19ο αιώνα. Η περίπτωση του Βουκουρεστίου (The Hellenism of Rumania in the 19th century. The case of Bucharest), postgraduate work, Aristotle University of Thessaloniki, Φιλοσοφική Σχολή, Section of history and archaeology, p. 22, 23
- Constantine Sathas, "Βιογραφίαι των εν τοις γράμμασι διαλαμψάντων Ελλήνων από της καταλύσεως της Βυζαντινής Αυτοκρατορίας μέχρι της Ελληνικής Εθνεγερσίας 1453-1821", publications Κουλτούρα, 1990, p. 684-685
