= Historical Romanian taxes =

Glossary

This is a glossary of historical Romanian taxes used in the principalities of Moldavia and Wallachia.

Name of the tax	Etymology	Description	Period
albinărit, stupărit, prisăcărit	albină (bee), stup, prisacă (beehive)	tax on beehives	
cotărit	cot (elbow)	tax on wholesales	
căldărit	căldare (bucket)	tax on alcohol distillation	
cepărit	cep (wine barrel spigot)	tax on taverns	
cerărit	ceară (wax)	tax on wax production	
cocărit	cocă (dough)	tax on maize production	
dijmărit	dijmă (tenth part)	tax on beehives and pigs	
folărit	foale (bellows used for cheese production)	tax on cheese production	
fumărit, coșărit	fumar, coș (chimney)	tax on chimneys	
ierbărit (Wallachia)	iarbă (grass)	tax on the usage of a pasture	
jugărit, lemnărit	jug (yoke), lemn (wood)	tax on cartfuls of wood taken from the forest	
măjărit	măjar (fishmonger)	tax on cartfuls of fish	
morărit	moară (mill)	tax on mills (watermills and windmills)	
oierit	oaie (sheep)	tax on sheep	
perperit	perper	tax on sold goods (paid in perper coins)	
pădurărit	pădure (forest)	tax on forests	
podărit	pod (bridge)	tax on crossing a bridge	
pogonărit	pogon	tax on each pogon of land owned	
popărit	popă (priest)	tax paid by the priests	
săpunărit	săpun (soap)	tax on soap	
solărit (Moldavia)	Slavic sol (salt)	tax on salt (extracted, transportated or sold)	18th century
tescovinărit	tescovină (grape brandy)	tax on grape brandy	
țigănărit	țigan (Gypsy)	tax on each Roma slave owned (see Slavery in Romania)	
tutunărit	tutun (tobacco)	tax on tobacco cultivation	
văcărit, cornărit (Moldavia), sulgiu	vacă (cow)	tax on cows	
vădrărit, vinărit, vinărici, pivnicerit, otaștină	vadră, vin (wine) pivniță (cellar)	tax on wine produced	
