= Alexander Mourouzis =

Prince of Moldavia and Wallachia (1750/1760–1816)

Prince Alexander Mourouzis
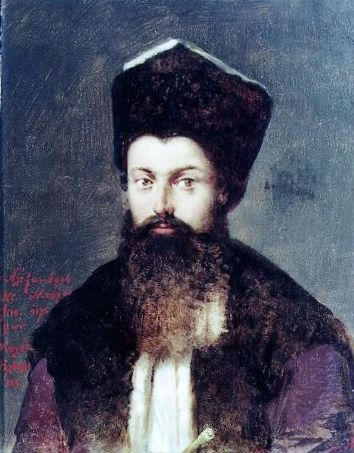
- Portrait by Nikiforos Lytras

Prince of Moldavia (1st reign)
- Reign: March 1792 – January 1793
- Predecessor: Emanuel Giani Ruset
- Successor: Michael Drakos Soutzos

Prince of Wallachia (1st reign)
- Reign: January 1793 – August 1796
- Predecessor: Michael Drakos Soutzos
- Successor: Alexander Ypsilantis

Prince of Wallachia (2nd reign)
- Reign: March 1799 – October 1801
- Predecessor: Constantine Hangerli
- Successor: Michael Drakos Soutzos

Prince of Moldavia (2nd reign)
- Reign: 4 October 1802 – August 1806
- Predecessor: Iordache Conta
- Successor: Scarlat Callimachi

Prince of Moldavia (3rd reign)
- Reign: 17 October 1806 – 19 March 1807
- Predecessor: Scarlat Callimachi
- Successor: Alexander Hangerli
- Born: 1750; Istanbul
- Died: 1816 (aged 65–66); Istanbul
- Issue: Constantine Mourouzis Dumitrache Mourouzis; Nicholas Mourouzis; Gheorghiu Mourouzis
- Religion: Orthodox Christian

Prince Alexander Mourouzis (Greek: Αλέξανδρος Μουρούζης; Romanian: Alexandru Moruzi; 1750/1760 – 1816) was a Grand Dragoman of the Ottoman Empire who served as Prince of Moldavia and Prince of Wallachia. Open to Enlightenment ideas, and noted for his interest in hydrological engineering, Mourouzis was forced to deal with the intrusions of Osman Pazvantoğlu's rebellious troops. In a rare gesture for his period, he renounced the throne in Wallachia, and his second rule in Moldavia was cut short by the intrigues of French diplomat Horace Sébastiani.

== Biography ==
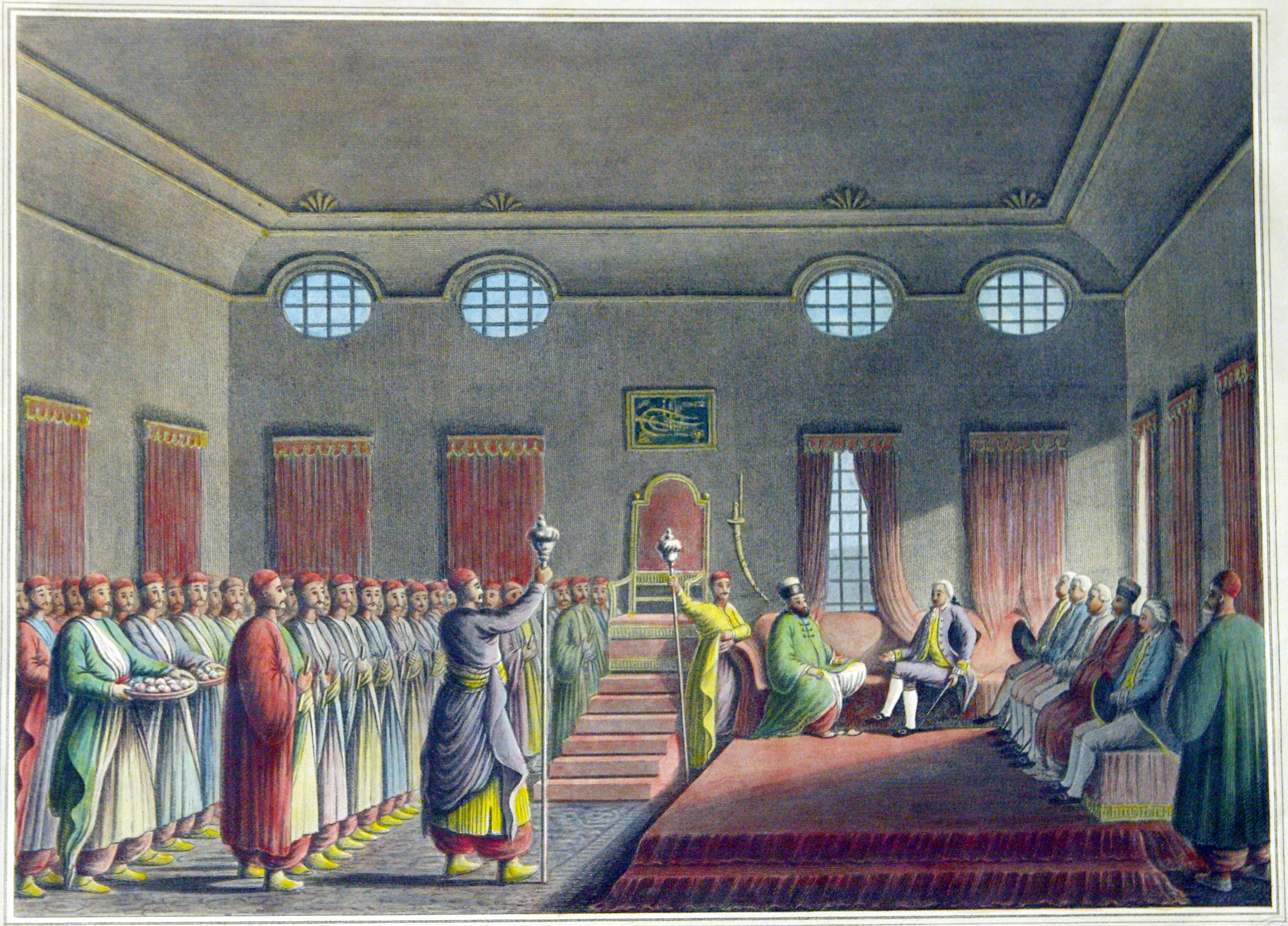
Alexander Mourouzis welcoming the British ambassador in Curtea Nouă.

A member of the Mourouzis family of Phanariotes and the son of Constantine Mourouzis (one of the few Ottoman-appointed Princes to die in office), he was educated to speak six languages in addition to Greek. His mother was a member of the Ghica family. Alexander was Grand Dragoman of the Porte under Sultan Selim III, in which capacity he helped mediate the 1791 Treaty of Jassy, ending the Russo-Turkish War of 1787–1792. Selim rewarded his service by appointing him to the throne in Iași (Moldavia) in January 1792, and transferred a year later to the throne of Bucharest (1793–1796), where his first year in office coincided with a bubonic plague outbreak (which he dealt with by quarantining and confining the ill to the village of Dudești).

Dismissed owing to intrigues at the Ottoman court, he was reinstated in Bucharest (1798–1801). In 1799, he passed a resolution ending the labor conflict at the cloth factory in Pociovaliște (presently part of Bucharest). After reforming its system of worker employment and payment, as well as hiring Saxon experts from Transylvania to manage the industry, he denied the workers' request to institute two weeks off for each week of labor, and ordered activities to be resumed, while stressing that it was imperative to respect the Ottoman demand for textiles (see Labor movement in Romania). At the time, the employees did not receive payment, but worked in exchange for tax exemptions.

Over the following year, Mourouzis had to deal with the incursion of Pazvantoğlu's rebellious troops in Oltenia, which resulted in the plundering and burning down much of the city of Craiova. News of the Craiova's destruction reached Bucharest and Mourouzis forbade fleeing the city; however, this did not prevent the boyars from sending their wealth into Habsburg lands for safekeeping. Mourouzis built fortifications on the road to Craiova and on the banks of Olt River; he attacked Pazvantoğlu's troops, who used the city's ruins as barricades — after several days of fighting, Pazvantoğlu and his troops fled Craiova and returned to Vidin. Powerless against the latter's destructive attacks, he asked to be relieved of his position, and, in a highly unusual gesture, paid off Ottoman authorities in exchange for his own replacement.

At the insistence of the French Empire, he was again appointed Prince of Moldavia (1802–1806 and 1806–1807), but was ultimately dismissed through another French intervention at the Porte - on August 12, 1806, Horace Sébastiani, the French Ambassador to the Ottoman Empire, called on Selim III to punish Constantine Ypsilantis' pro-Russian activities in Wallachia, and to prevent a Moldavian-Wallachian-Russian alliance. This last event constituted one of the causes for the Russo-Turkish War of 1806–1812.

Mustafa IV ordered Mourouzis to be sent to the galleys, but he was pardoned soon after. He died at his home in Constantinople, and rumor had it that he was poisoned.

== Achievements ==
Mourouzis was an Enlightenment prince, whose time on the two thrones was connected with modernization. The prince belonged to the Freemasonry, having affiliated with two separate Lodges: in 1773, he was a member of the one active in the Transylvanian city of Hermannstadt, and, after 1803, belonged to the Moldavian Freemason branch in Galați. His Western contacts and his political ideals were probably connected with the goal of uniting the two Danubian Principalities under a single prince, as a symbolic legacy of Dacia: an 1800 atlas published in Vienna referred to his two rules as a single leadership of "the two Dacias". As local legislation was primarily based on Byzantine law, he acknowledged the importance given to the Hexabiblos of 14th century Byzantine jurist Konstantinos Armenopoulos, and ordered it to be translated into Romanian — although it failed to become official law in Wallachia, the Hexabiblos was widely used for reference by the Bucharest Divan.

During his rules in Bucharest, Mourouzis notably rebuilt the princely residence of Curtea Nouă, instituted a boyar office as centralized tax collection in the capital city, and increased the water supply by tapping sources in the Cotroceni area. His interest in waterworks was also manifested during his stay in Moldavia, where he tapped water and built a reservoir for the capital Iași (through a system leading up to Golia Monastery) and provided Focșani with water from over the Milcov River (achieved following an understanding with Wallachia's Alexander Ypsilantis). It was in 1793 that the first modern retailing firm was inaugurated in Wallachia, maintained by the Frenchman Hortolan.

Under his rules, Wallachian and Moldavian ships for navigation on the Danube were built at newly created shipyards. He also organized the first mail delivery system in Moldavia. Like his father before him, Alexander Mourouzis founded schools and donated six-year scholarships for disadvantaged children. Among the educational institutions he created was the Orthodox seminary in Iași's Socola Monastery. He took a personal interest in scientific education, and attended experiments in physics at the Moldavian capital's Princely School.

During his first reign over Moldavia, Mourouzis notably passed a resolution clarifying the surface of land which boyars were required to allocate to peasants working on their estates. It is the first document to divide agricultural workers into the three traditional categories, based on the number of oxen owned, of fruntași ("foremost people"), mijlocași ("middle people") and codași ("backward people"). At the time, it was recorded that associations of fruntași could function as estate leaseholders in the service of boyars or Orthodox monasteries. This right was suppressed in 1815.

== In cultural references ==
Mourouzis was the recipient of a panegyric authored by the Moldavian boyar poet Costache Conachi, who praised the prince's achievements in hydrotechnics. Comments made on the poem, published by the Romantic nationalist Gheorghe Sion, were the subject of an 1873 disagreement between him and literary critic Titu Maiorescu. The latter placed Sion's essay among his examples of "inebriation with words" (a term which he and the Junimea society had coined as a definition for incoherent and needlessly subjective criticism).

== Notes ==
Preceded by Manuel Caradja	Grand Dragoman of the Porte; 1790–1792	Succeeded by George Mourouzis
Preceded by Russian occupation	Prince of Moldavia; 1792	Succeeded by Michael Drakos Soutzos
Preceded by Caimacam Iordache Conta	Prince of Moldavia; 1802–1806	Succeeded by Scarlat Callimachi
Preceded by Scarlat Callimachi	Prince of Moldavia; 1806–1807	Succeeded by Russian occupation
Preceded by Michael Drakos Soutzos	Prince of Wallachia; 1793–1796	Succeeded by Alexander Ypsilantis
Preceded by Constantin Hangerli	Prince of Wallachia; 1799–1801	Succeeded by Michael Drakos Soutzos
