= Greeks in Romania =

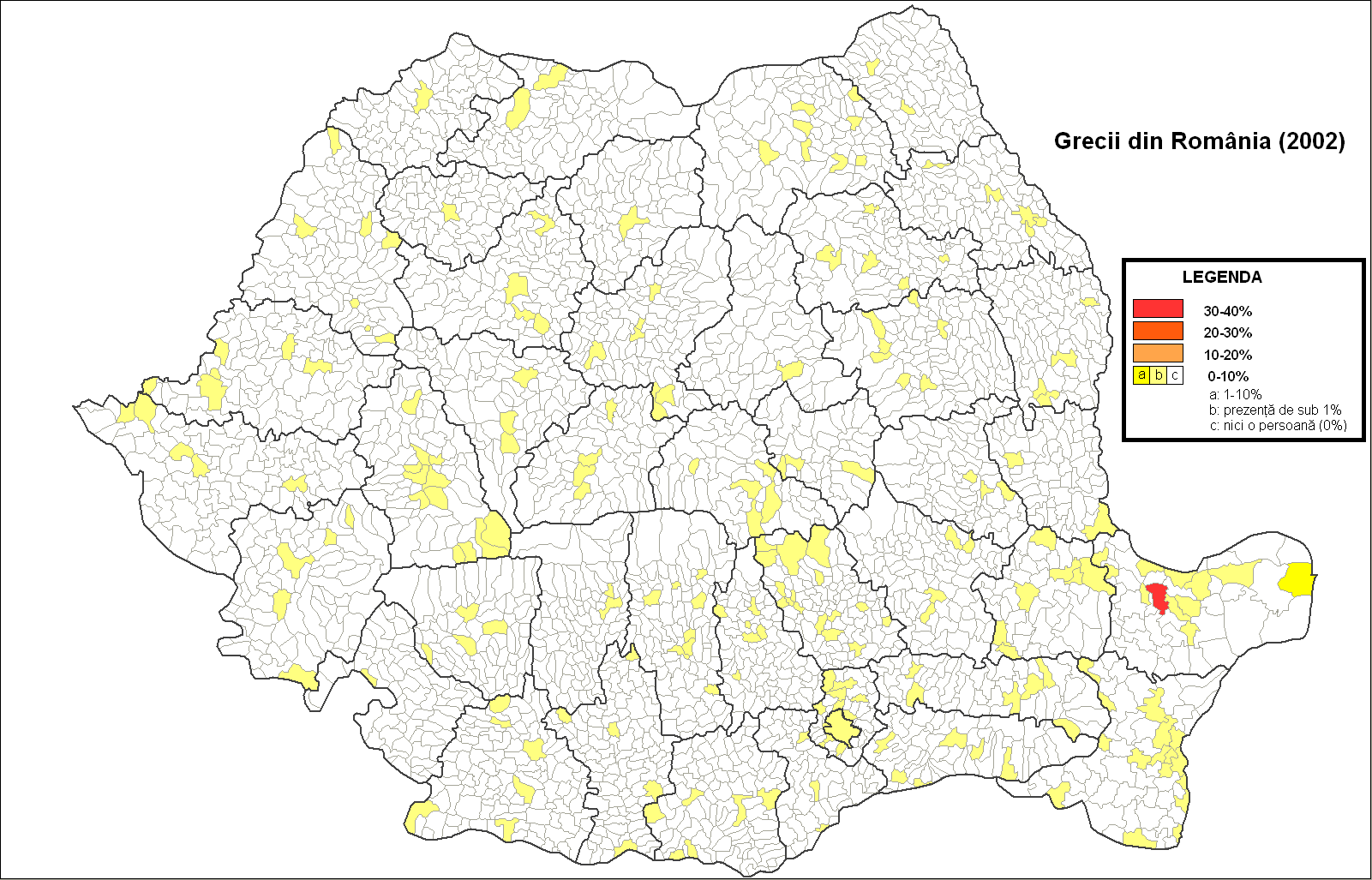
Greeks in Romania (2002)

Greeks are a historic minority group in Romania. At times, as during the Phanariote era, this presence has amounted to hegemony; at other times (including the present), the Greeks have simply been one among the many ethnic minorities in Romania.

== History ==
=== Ancient and medieval periods ===
The Greek presence in what is now Romania dates back as far as the apoikiai (colonies) and emporia (trade stations) founded in and around Dobruja (see Colonies in antiquity and Pontic Greeks), beginning in the 7th century BC. Starting with the Milesian colony at Istros, the process reached its height after Tomis was founded in the 5th century BC. Although forever subject to the Dacian interference and easily disrupted by changes in the politics of neighbour tribal chieftains, the colonies prospered until being briefly submitted in various forms by King Burebista (late 1st century BC). Immediately after, and for the following centuries, they were stripped of their privileges by their new Roman masters, and followed the Empire into its crises.

In the Middle Ages, the Greek-speaking Byzantine Empire was a living presence north of the Danube, maintaining a cultural hegemony over the lands virtually until its disappearance, and for long periods exercised actual political dominance in the area of modern Dobruja (known to the Byzantines as Scythia Minor).

=== Early modern period ===
After the fall of the Byzantine Empire to the Ottoman Empire, the Hospodars of Moldavia and Wallachia (the Danubian Principalities) often took on the patronage of many Greek-proper cultural institutions such as several monasteries on Mount Athos, gestures guaranteed to provide prestige within Eastern Orthodox culture. To this was added the exodus of Byzantine officials and commoners to the two countries, which were at the time under a rather relaxed Ottoman tutelage. They took opportunities to advance in office, and from early on included themselves in the inner circle of power. This meant not only the reliance of Princes on a new elite (more often than not, also one to provide it with the funds needed by the administrative effort), but also the gradual ascendancy of Greeks to the thrones themselves.

The rapid change brought them much hostility from traditional boyars. Landowners in a rudimentary economy, accustomed to have an important say in political developments, these found themselves stripped of importance in the new structure, and became bitterly hostile to the immigrants. However, this was not the only notable trend: there were numerous cases of intermarriage at the top of the social scale (and not only), the arguably most famous of which being the ones inside the very powerful Cantacuzino family.

=== The Phanariote period ===
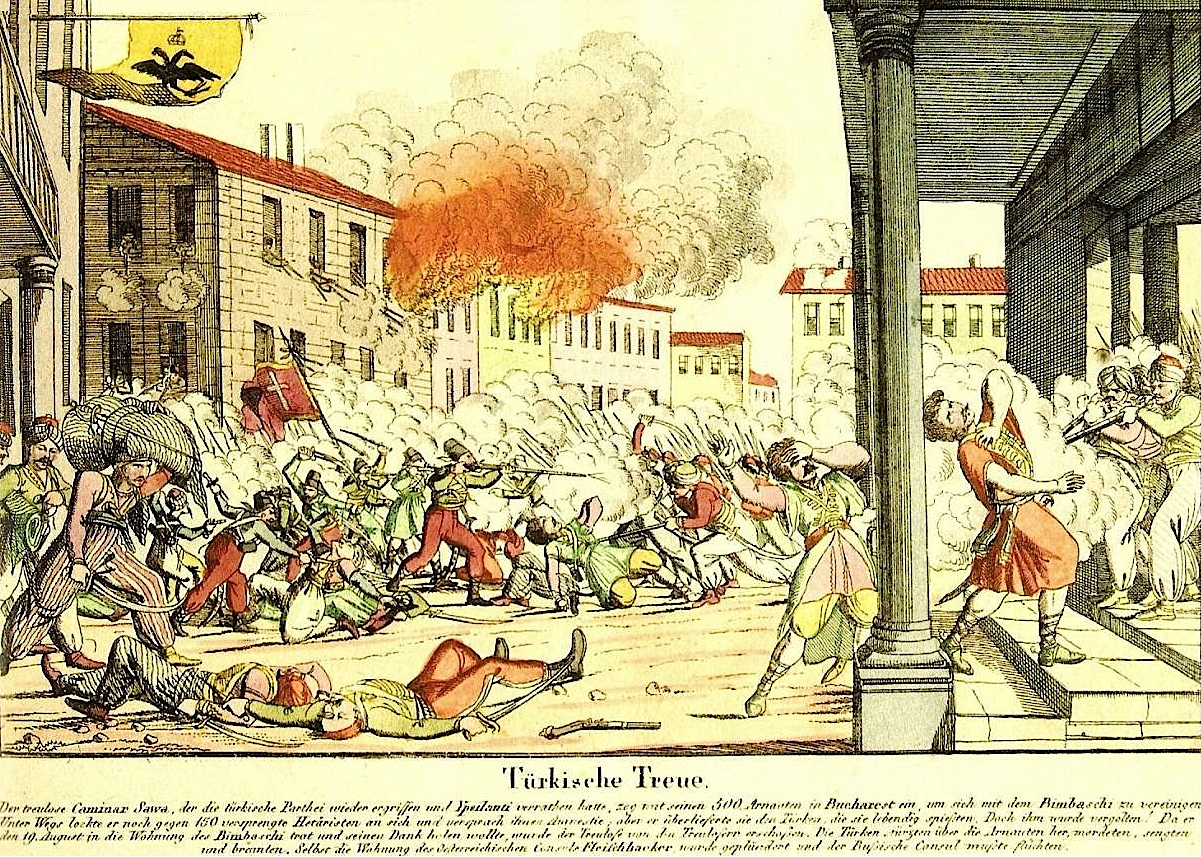
Fighting between the Philikí Etaireía and Ottomans in Bucharest, late 1821.

With the early 18th century emergence of Phanariote rule over the Danubian Principalities, Greek culture became a norm. On one hand, this meant a noted neglect for the institutions inside the countries; on the other, the channeling of Princes' energies into emancipation from Ottoman rule, through projects that aimed for the erasing of inner borders of the Empire, moving toward the creation of an all-Balkan, neo-Byzantine state (seen as the extended identity of Greekdom). To these was added the omnipresence and omnipotence of Greek ethnic clerics at all levels of the religious hierarchy, with many monasteries becoming directly submitted to similar institutions in Greece, after being gradually granted by successive Princes.

Thus, the emergence of Greek nationalism opened the two lands to revolution, as the main concentrations of political power available to it at the time, and the ones sharing a border with the expected supporter of the cause - Imperial Russia. The Wallachian stage of the Greek War of Independence consumed itself in a conflict between the initially supportive Anti-Ottoman Revolt led by Tudor Vladimirescu and the Philikí Etaireía, while Moldavia was under Greek occupation for a limited duration. The outcome only served to stir up animosity, and the Ottomans were receptive to the demands, putting an end to the Phanariote system in 1822.

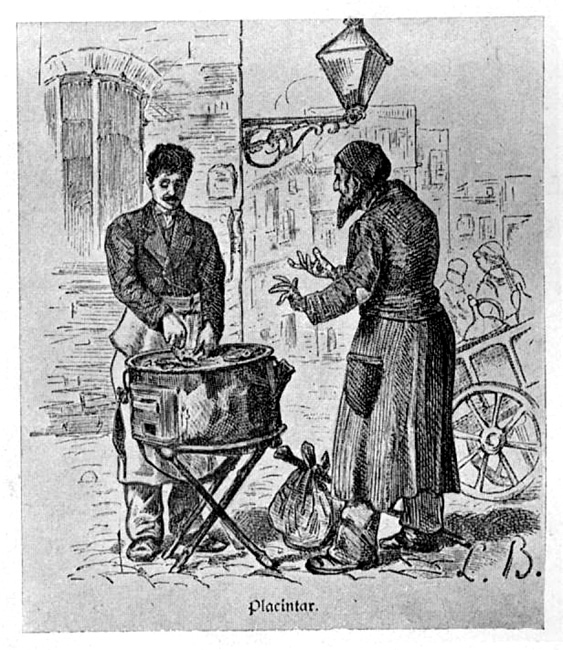
A Greek pie-maker and his Jewish client in Bucharest, ca. 1880

=== 19th and 20th centuries ===
In time, most Greeks lost their specificity and became fully integrated (for example, a sizable portion of noble families considered "Phanariote" contributed to the adopted culture more than local ones).

With new trends of migration, Romania became a less important target for exiled Greeks, and this became limited to people of lower social status—with ethnic Greeks being most visible as entrepreneurs, middlemen traders, and especially sailors (both on the Danube the Black Sea—in the case of the latter, after the integration of Dobruja in 1878, which also gave Romania a new population of Greeks, already on the spot).

The communities were largely prosperous and maintained specific cultural institutions; they attracted a new wave of arrivals when Greece was hit by the Civil War, in the late 1940s. This situation was challenged by Communist Romania, with the properties of most organizations and many individuals being confiscated, and hundreds of Greek ethnics being imprisoned on sites such as the Danube-Black Sea Canal.

== Present situation ==
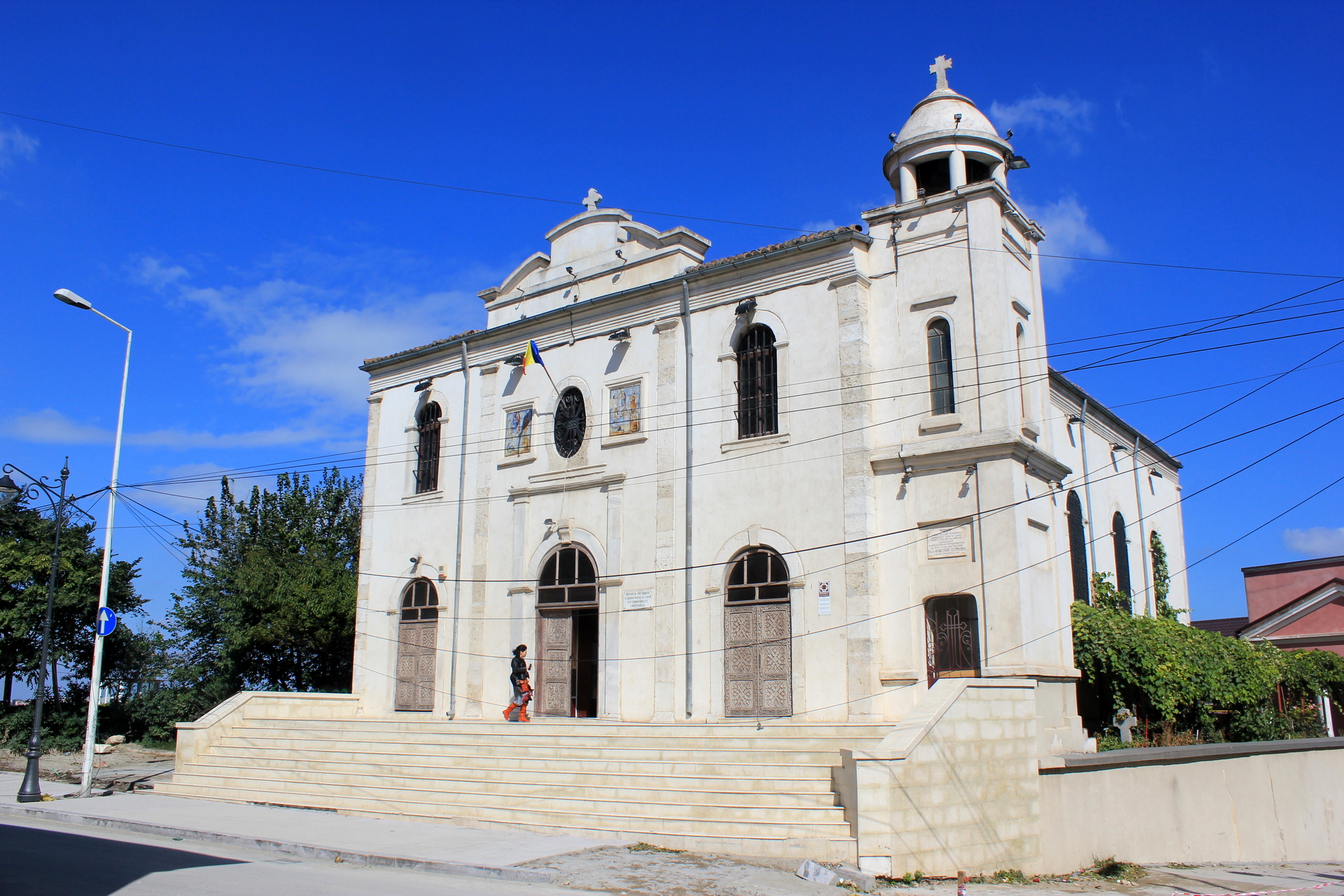
Eastern Orthodox Church Metamorphosis in Constanța, with service occasionally held in Greek

Among the towns and communes in Romania with the highest proportions of Greeks as of 2011 are Izvoarele (Greek: Ιζβοάρελε; 43.82%) and Sulina (Greek: Σουλινάς; 1.69%), both in Tulcea County.

According to the Romanian census of 2002, the Greek community numbered 6,472 persons, most of whom live in Bucharest and its surrounding area. Next in line come the Dobruja counties of Tulcea and Constanța, and the Danube-facing ones of Brăila and Galați. The 1992 census however found 19,594 Greeks; this shows the tendency of assimilation. According to the General Secretariat for Greeks Abroad (a dependency of the Greek Ministry of Foreign Affairs) the Greek community in Romania numbers 14,000.

The Hellenic Union of Romania, founded in 1990, represents the political and cultural preservation interests of the community, notably by providing its representatives in the Chamber of Deputies of Romania.

== Notable Romanian people of Greek origin ==
=== Phanariotes ===
- the Callimachi family
- the Caradja family
- Nicolae Caradja
- Jean Georges Caradja
- the Mavrocordatos family
- Nicholas Mavrogenes
- Constantin and Alexandru Moruzi
- Alexander and Constantine Ypsilanti
- Constantine and Alexander Hangerli

=== Non-Phanariote rulers over the Danubian Principalities ===
- Ioan Iacob Heraclid
- Gheorghe and Constantin Duca
- the Cantacuzino family

=== Figures of Wallachian uprising of 1821 ===
- Yiannis Farmakis
- Vasilios Karavias

=== Other Important Figures ===
- Michael the Brave
- Nicolae Iorga
- Costache Aristia
- Vasile Alecsandri
- Ion Heliade Rădulescu
- Constantin Levaditi
- Alexandru Dimitrie Xenopol
- Marthe Bibesco
- Rosetti family

=== Modern-day persons of Greek origin or heritage ===
- Gheorghe Hagi - former football player
- Simona Halep - former tennis player
- Grigore Antipa - scientist
- Constantin von Economo - psychiatrist and neurologist
- Radu Beligan - Romanian actor
- Cezar Bolliac - writer and political activist
- Elie Carafoli - engineer, pioneer in aerodynamics
- Ion Luca Caragiale - writer and playwright, his uncles Costache Caragiale and Iorgu Caragiale - actors, and his son Mateiu Caragiale - novelist and poet
- George Ciprian - actor and playwright
- Christos Tsaganeas - actor
- Jean Constantin - actor
- Nicu Alifantis - actor
- Noti Constantinide - diplomat
- Radu Portocală - politician
- Elena of Greece - Queen Mother and Regent of Romania
- Andreas Embirikos - poet
- Elena Farago - writer
- Filotti family - originated from the island of Naxos
- Panait Istrati - writer and political activist
- Antigone Kefala - poet
- Nicolae Malaxa - industrialist
- Nicolae Mavros - Romanian general and politician
- Jean Moscopol - singer
- Anna de Noailles - poet
- Alexandru Paleologu - writer, diplomat, politician
- Dimitrie Panaitescu Perpessicius - literary critic
- Călin Popescu-Tăriceanu - Prime Minister of Romania
- Iannis Xenakis, composer and architect
- Sergiu Celibidache, classical conductor

== See also ==
- Greece–Romania relations
- Ethnic groups in Greece who were subject to immigration in Romania:
  - Aromanians
  - Megleno-Romanians
- Romanians in Greece
