= List of dragomans =

The following is a list of dragomans.

- Đorđe Branković (count) (1645–1711), Serbian dragoman who spoke Romanian, Hungarian, German, Turkish and other languages and dialects.
- Jean-Baptiste Adanson (1732–1803), Scottish-French
- Janus Bey, Ottoman Empire interpreter and ambassador who was active in Europe in the 1530s.
- Vincenzo Belluti (19th century), Maltese
- Wojciech Bobowski (1610–1675), Polish
- Stefan Bogoridi (1775/1780–1859), Bulgarian
- Hammad Hassab Bureik Egyptian dragoman employed by Henry S. Harper. Survived the sinking of the Titanic.
- Ioan Teodor Callimachi, Greek-Romanian
- Alexandru Callimachi, Greek-Romanian
- Nicolae Caradja (18th century), Greek
- Alexandru Matei Ghica (18th century), Greek
- Jean Georges Caradja (19th century), Greek
- Armand-Pierre Caussin de Perceval (1795–1871), French
- Charles Simon Clermont-Ganneau (1846–1923), French
- Rigas Feraios (*1757–1798), Greek
- Tomasso Barthold,(1774–1811), Italian
- Gerald Henry Fitzmaurice, (1865–1939), British
- Charles Fonton (1725–1793), French
- Gaspar Graziani (1575/1580–1620), Italian
- Alexander Hangerli (d. 1854), Greek
- Constantine Hangerli (d. 1799), Greek
- Martin Hartmann (1851–1918), German
- Alexander Knox Helm, (1893–1964), British
- Petar Ičko (1755–1808), Ottoman Greek who was Karađorđe's personal dragoman.
- Johannes Kolmodin (1884–1933), Swedish
- Clément Huart, French
- Auguste de Jaba (1801–1894), Polish-Lithuanian-Russian
- Hadjigeorgakis Kornesios, Greek
- Nassif Mallouf (1823–1865), Lebanese
- Manuc Bei (1769–1817), Armenian
- Alexander II Mavrocordatos (18th century), Greek
- John Mavrocordatos (18th century), Greek
- Nicholas Mavrocordatos (1670–1730), Greek
- Nicolae Mavrogheni (18th century), Greek
- Alexander Mourousis (d.1816), Greek
- Constantine Mourousis (d. 1783), Greek
- Antoine de Murat (ca. 1739–1813), Armenian
- Solomon Negima (d.1933)
- Panayot Nikousia (17th century), Greek
- The Pisani Family
- Georg Rosen (b. 1821), Prussian
- Andrew Ryan (1876–1941), British
- Beyzade Aleko Soutzos (d. 1807), Greek
- Mihai Suţu (1730–1802), Greek
- The Testa Family
- Johann Amadeus Francis de Paula, Baron of Thugut (1736–1818), Austrian
- Ármin Vámbéry (1832–1913), Hungarian
- Alexander Ypsilantis (1725–1805), Greek

== Definition ==
A dragoman was an interpreter, translator, and official guide between Turkish, Arabic, and Persian-speaking countries and polities of the Middle East and European embassies, consulates, vice-consulates and trading posts. A dragoman had to have a knowledge of Arabic, Persian, Turkish, and European languages.
