= Alexander Callimachi =

Prince of Moldavia from 1795 to 1799

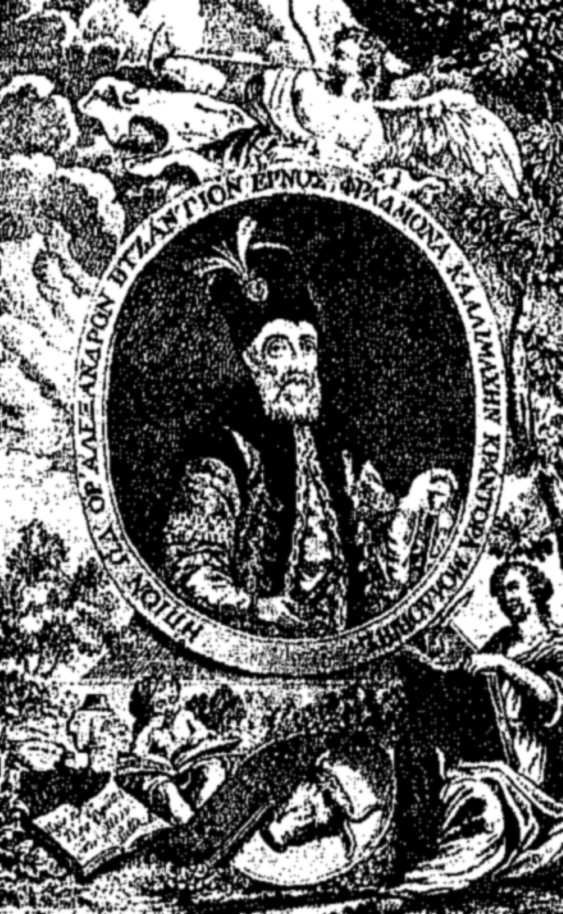
- Callimachi in 1797

Prince of Moldavia
- Reign: 6 May 1795 – 18 March 1799
- Predecessor: Michael Drakos Soutzos
- Successor: Constantine Ypsilantis
- Born: 1737; Constantinople, Ottoman Empire (now Istanbul, Turkey)
- Died: 12 December 1821 (aged 83–84); Bolu, Ottoman Empire (now Bolu, Turkey)
- Spouse: Elena Ghica
- Issue: Rallou, wife of Ypsilantis; Scarlat Callimachi, hospodar Eufrosina; Ioan
- Dynasty: Bogdan-Mușat
- Father: John Theodore Callimachi
- Mother: Ralitsa Chrysoskoleos
- Religion: Orthodox

Alexander Callimachi (1737 – 12 December 1821) was Prince of Moldavia during the period of 6 May 1795 through 18 March 1799.

== Early years ==
Alexander Callimachi was born in Constantinople. His family were an established Moldavian-Greek Phanariote boyar and princely house. He was the son of John Theodore Callimachi, Prince of Moldavia, and Ralitsa Chrysoskoleos. Alexander had three siblings: Gregory Callimachi (1735–1769), Prince of Moldavia; sister, Sevastitsa (born 1736), who married Michael Drakos Soutzos, Prince of Moldavia; and sister, Maria (1740–1831). His uncle Gavriil Callimachi (1689–1786) was a monk at Putna Monastery before he founded the St. George Cathedral in Iași.

== Career ==
Callimachi served as Grand Dragoman of the Sublime Porte from 1785 to 1794. He gained the title of Prince of Moldavia in 1795. After Callimachi was deposed, he was succeeded by son-in-law Constantine Ypsilantis.

With his reign over, Callimachi retired to Constantinople.

== Personal life ==
Callimachi sealed a matrimonial alliance with his marriage to Elena Ghika, daughter of Scarlat Ghika Vodă, Prince of Moldavia and Prince of Wallachia. They had four children. Their oldest was daughter, Rallou (1769–1797), who married Ypsilantis in 1783. Their first son, the hospodar Scarlat Callimachi, was Prince of Moldavia at three different times, while Scarlat's son Alexandros was conferred the Ottoman title of Bala in June 1861, the first Christian to be so honored. They had two younger children, a daughter, Euphrosyne (1776–1835), and a son, John (1775–1821).

Callimachi died in Bolu in 1821, the same year that Phanariote rule ended with the outbreak of the Greek War of Independence against the Ottoman Empire.

Preceded by Michael Drakos Soutzos	Grand Dragoman of the Porte; 1785–1788	Succeeded by Constantine Rallis
Preceded by Michael Drakos Soutzos	Prince of Moldavia; 1795–1799	Succeeded by Constantine Ypsilantis
