= Grigore III Ghica =

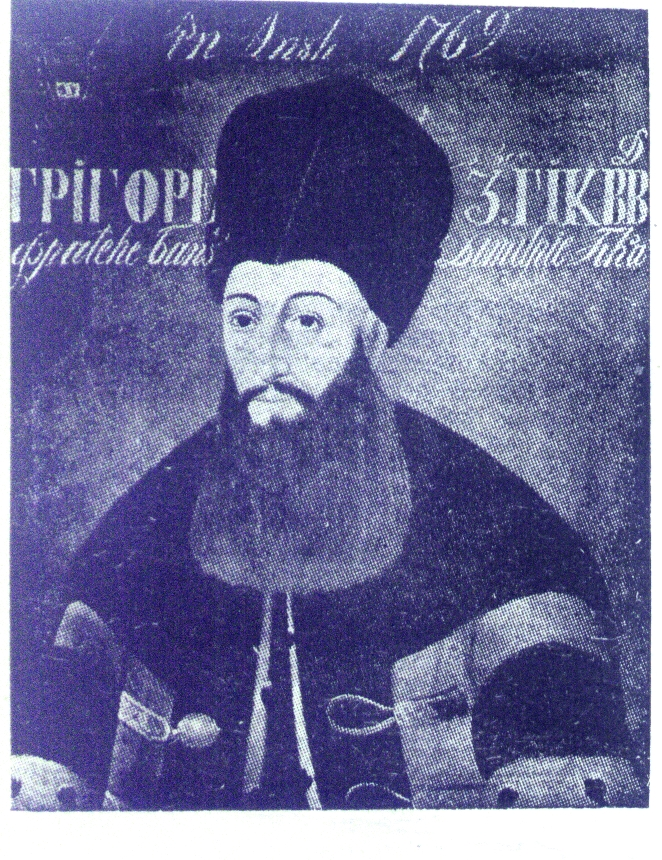

Prince of Moldavia (1st reign)
- Reign: 29 March 1764 – 3 February 1767
- Predecessor: Grigore Callimachi
- Successor: Grigore Callimachi

Prince of Wallachia
- Reign: 17 October 1768 – 5 November 1769
- Predecessor: Alexandru Ghica
- Successor: Emanuel Giani Ruset

Prince of Moldavia (2nd reign)
- Reign: September 1774 – 10 October 1777
- Predecessor: Constantin Mavrocordat
- Successor: Constantine Mourouzis
- Born: 1724
- Died: 12 October 1777 (aged 52–53); Iași
- Spouse: Ecaterine Rizou-Rangave
- Issue: Demetrius Ghica
- House: Ghica family
- Religion: Orthodox

Grigore III Ghica (1724 – 12 October 1777) was a prince of Moldavia and of Wallachia. (Note: 29 March 1764 – 3 February 1767 and September 1774 – 10 October 1777. And 28 October 1768 – November 1769.)

== Biography ==
He was the son of Alexandru Matei Ghica, with the position of dragoman, who was beheaded by the Sublime Porte and nephew of Grigore II Ghica's brother. Gregory III Ghica had a sister, Catherine (or Catinca), married to the Greek hetman Dumitru Sulgearoglu (also called Dimitrie Gheorghiadis Sulgearoglu). Catherine's descendants bore the name of her mother, Ghica, as Dora d'Istria states in her writing Gli Albanesi in Rumenia (1871): "[Costachi Ghica], Son of Catherine, sister of Gregory III, married to Demetrio Sutziaroglu. Catherine's descendants bear her mother's name." As a gentleman, he is an enemy of Austria and a friend of Russia, and the intrigues help him a lot in his policy towards the Turks. Internally, it has regularized the collection of offices and put an end to abuses. He set up a cloth factory in Chipirești, near Jijia and built a school near the Metropolitanate as a result of the reorganization of education, designed by him. Through the measures taken, he managed to bring the country to a relative well-being.

A Phanariote ruler (domnitor) of the Ghica family, Grigore Ghica was assassinated by the Ottomans for opposing the annexation of the northwestern part of Moldavia (later named Bukovina) by the Habsburg Empire.

Replaced with Gregory Callimachi in 1767, he won the throne of Wallachia, from where, on the occasion of the occupation of the Principalities by the Russians, he was taken prisoner and taken to Russia. He regained the throne of Moldavia after the Treaty of Küçük Kaynarca in 1774. He was enthroned as lord in September 1774, but the appointing firm arrived in Iași on 9 October 1774. Austria secretly agreed with Russia and in 1775 obtained from the North Gate the west of Moldavia, which he would call "Bukovina", although the ruler and the boyars protested vehemently. Thus, the old Romanian lands, Chernivtsi, Storojineț, to a large extent Suceava with Putna of Stephen the Great and the chain of monasteries of the Romanian genius embedded in the Bucovina topic were annexed by Austria. In a "dispatch" to the Gate, Ghica Voda wrote: "The occupied part of Moldova [Bucovina] surpasses in abundance and value all the other part of the country." As he protested against the loss of this territory, the Austrians demanded that the Turks remove it.

== Death ==
The Turks sent a hood (executor), Ahmed Cara Hisarli-aga, to Grigore's court, with the order to communicate his death and to bring him alive or dead to Istanbul. Capugiul, who arrived in Iași, set a trap for the ruler: he pretended to be ill and invited him to the inn in Beilic, where the Turkish rulers were staying, passing through the capital of Moldova, to read his royal signature.

The ruler, reckless, took with him only the chief of the guard, tufecci-başa, with two children of the house, three boyars and a chamberlain. (Note: Vtori = second; chamberlain = boyar who took care of his voda chamber, chamberlain.) When he entered the hood room, the ruler seeing himself surrounded by armed Turks, realized the danger. But it was too late. The hood asked for tobacco and, handing him the cigar case, he also motioned for the hangman to hit him with the hanger. He killed him at S.N. 12 October 1777, to the indignation of European public opinion. Grigore was decapitated and, lowering his body to the window, was buried at the bottom of the garden.

The scene of the assassination is described with some modifications in: "he was served coffee and, when he bent down to take the cup, at a sign from the Turkish emissary, the Turkish guard cut off the ruler's head and threw his body out the window. And so he died in a quarrel with his assassins Gregory III of Moldavia, on 1 October 1777, his head was taken to Istanbul, his body being buried at the monastery of St. Spiridon in Iasi. During his reign he also faced opposition from some large boyars from Moldova who insisted on increasing the number of boyar days to 36. [boyar = obligation of peasants to work for the boyar, in exchange for a plot of land, put into use].

Professor and historian Ion Nistor, in his paper History of Bukovina reproduces the notes of a correspondent from Istanbul, dated 19 November 1777, on the cause of the assassination of the ruler of Moldavia by order of the Sultan "... This gentleman did not want to consent at all costs to the cession of Bukovina in favor of Austria. As can be seen, he behaved like an independent sovereign."

In his work on the Sion Family, Gh. Ungureanu quotes the description of the murder of Grigore Ghica Voda, made in the chronicle written by Iordachi Sion and continued by his son Antohi: a capigi-başa by order of the Gate di mazilit pre Grigori Vodă Ghica and at three o'clock and half of the night they killed him at the houses in Beilic, a pity for him how they killed him and what kind of death the poor man died -and his Lady and the beizadels took them and took them to Ţarigrad - woe to them..."

He is buried at the church of Saint Spiridon in Iasi, under the stone whose inscription (in Greek) reminds that: and descending from great ancestors being abducted by death before time and now living in the dwellings of heaven.

== Legacy ==
In literature he is met as the main character of the first play written in Romanian: Occisio Gregorii in Moldavia Vodae tragice expressa.

== Personal life ==
He married Ecaterine Rizou-Rangave and his son was

- Demetrius Ghica, who married Eufrosine Caradja, and was father of
  - Grigore IV Ghica,
  - Alexandru II Ghica and
  - Michai Ghica, father of
    - Elena Ghica (pen-name Dora d'Istria).

== Bibliography ==
- Xenopol, A. D. (1929). Istoria romînilor din Dacia Traiană (in Romanian). Vol. VIII.

Preceded by John Callimachi	Grand Dragoman of the Porte; 1758–1764	Succeeded by George Caradja
Preceded by Grigore Callimachi	Prince/Voivode of Moldavia; 1764–1767	Succeeded by Grigore Callimachi
Preceded by Russian occupation	Prince/Voivode of Moldavia; 1774–1777	Succeeded by Constantin Moruzi
Preceded by Russian occupation	Prince/Voivode of Wallachia; 1768-1769	Succeeded by Russian occupation
