= Teodor Calmășul =

Teodor Calmăşul was a low level boyar from the Orhei region of Bessarabia, founder of the princely family of Callimachi, the hellenized form of the name.

He established himself in Câmpulung, where he founded a church. The chronicles of Ioan Canta portray him as a "good God-fearing Christian, living his life with little opportunity under the protection of the church and with other good deeds, according to his ability."

Two of his sons attained important positions. Ioan Teodor Callimachi was a Prince of Moldavia from 1758 to 1761, and Gavriil Callimachi rose to the position of Metropolitan of Moldavia which he held until his death in 1786.

== Sources ==
- Nita Dan Danielescu. "Gavriil Callimachi, ctitorul Catedralei mitropolitane Sf. Gheorghe din Iasi" Ziarul Lumina, 2006-02-20
