= Hangerli =

Hangerli is a surname. Notable people with the surname include:

- Alexander Hangerli (1768–1854), Prince of Moldavia, brother of Constantine
- Constantine Hangerli (1760–1799), Prince of Wallachia
