= Callimachi family =

Greek-Moldavian noble family

Coat of arms of Princes Callimachi

The House of Callimachi, Calimachi, or Kallimachi (Greek: Καλλιμάχη, Russian: Каллимаки, Turkish: Kalimakizade; originally Calmașul or Călmașu), was a Phanariote family of mixed Moldavian (Romanian) and Greek origins, whose members occupied many important positions in Moldavia, Romania and the Ottoman Empire.

== History ==
Originating in the boyardom of Orhei County, it gave Moldavia four reigning princes. The family remains present today in modern Romania.

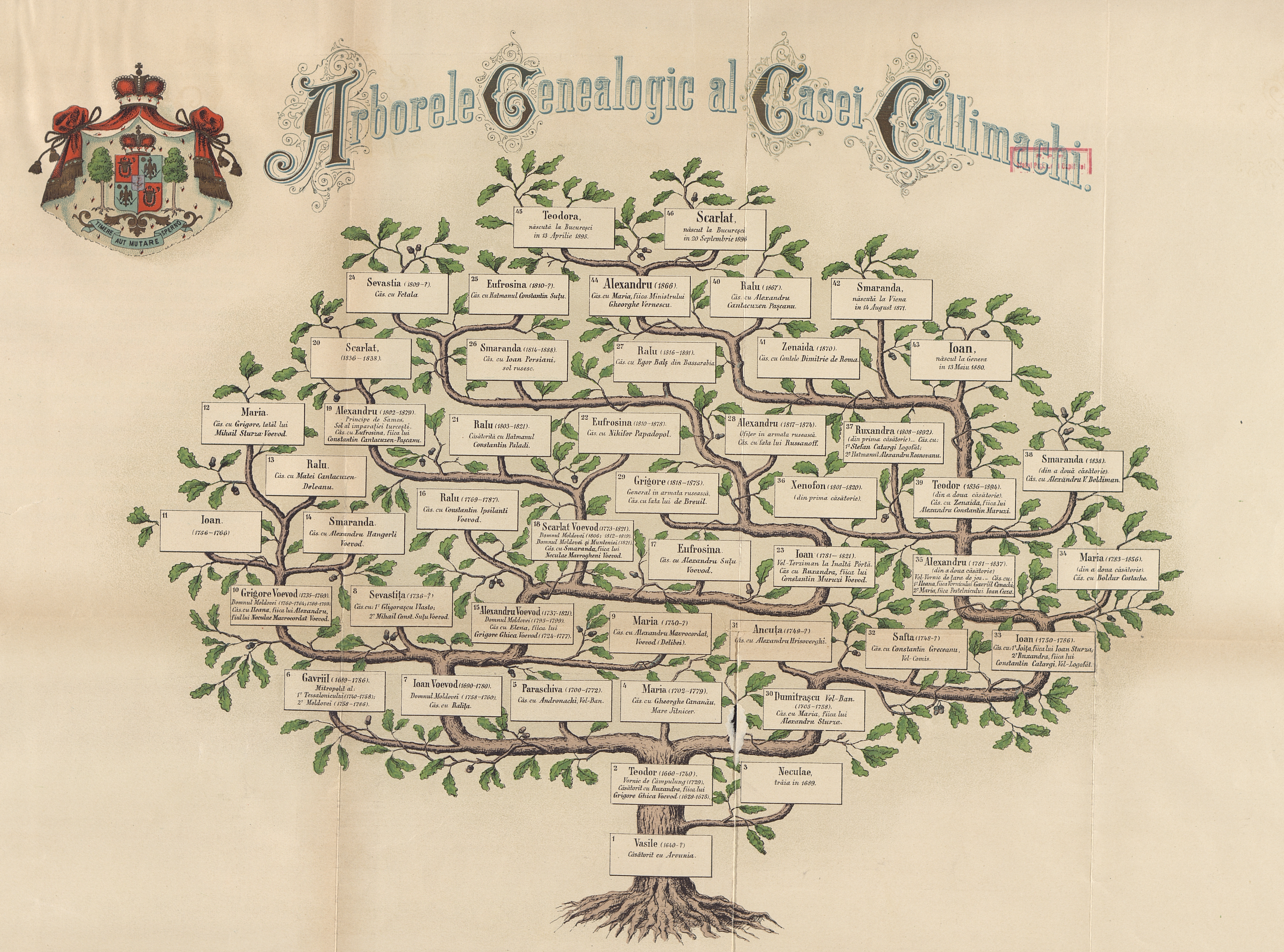
Family tree of the Callimachi family

== Notable members ==
=== Agnatic ===
- Vasile Călmașul, Moldavian landowner
- Teodor Calmășul, Moldavian boyar
- Ioan Teodor Callimachi, Prince of Moldavia (1758–1761)
- Gavriil Callimachi, Orthodox monk, Metropolitan of Moldavia (?–1786)
- Grigore Callimachi, Prince of Moldavia (1761–1764; 1767–1769)
- Alexandru Callimachi, Prince of Moldavia (1795–1799)
- Scarlat Callimachi, Prince of Moldavia (1806; de jure 1807–1810; 1812–1819); Prince of Wallachia (de jure 1821)
- Alexandros Kallimachis, Ottoman diplomat, Governor of Samos (1850–1854)
- Scarlat Callimachi, Romanian communist activist (1896–1975)

=== Matrilineal ===
- Alexandru Papadopol-Calimah, Romanian cabinet minister and scholar
- Rukmini Callimachi, American journalist

=== By marriage ===
- Dida Solomon-Callimachi, Romanian actress and writer
