= Nicolaus Handjery =

Durchlaucht Nicolaus Handjery

Regierungspräsident of Liegnitz
- In office 16 March 1885 – 1 April 1895

Landrat of Kreis Teltow
- In office 13 August 1870 – March 1885

Member of the Reichstag
- In office 1881–1893
- Constituency: Potsdam 10 (Teltow–Beeskow-Storkow–Charlottenburg)

Member of the Reichstag of the North German Confederation and German Reichstag
- In office 1869 – January 1874
- Preceded by: Albrecht von Roon
- Constituency: Potsdam 10 (Teltow–Beeskow-Storkow)

Member of the Prussian House of Representatives
- In office 1870–1876
- In office 1879–1882

Personal details
- Born: Heinz Nicolaus Prinz Handjery; 18 December 1836 Constantinople, Ottoman Empire
- Died: 7 December 1900 (aged 63) Dresden, Kingdom of Saxony, German Empire
- Resting place: Alter St.-Matthäus-Kirchhof, Berlin
- Party: Conservative Party; German Conservative Party
- Education: University of Berlin; University of Bonn (Dr. jur.)
- Profession: Jurist, administrative civil servant, politician

Prince Heinz Nicolaus of Handjery (German: Heinz Nicolaus Prinz von Handjery, 18 December 1836 – 7 December 1900) was a German administrative lawyer, civil servant, and politician of the German Conservative Party. During the German Empire, he served as a member of the Reichstag (1869–1874 and 1881–1893) and the Prussian House of Representatives (1870–1876 and 1879–1882). As a senior Prussian administrator, he was the long-serving Landrat (district administrator) of Kreis Teltow from 1870 to 1885, overseeing its rapid urban transformation during the Gründerzeit, and later served as Regierungspräsident (regional government president) of Liegnitz from 1885 until 1895.

== Early life and family background ==
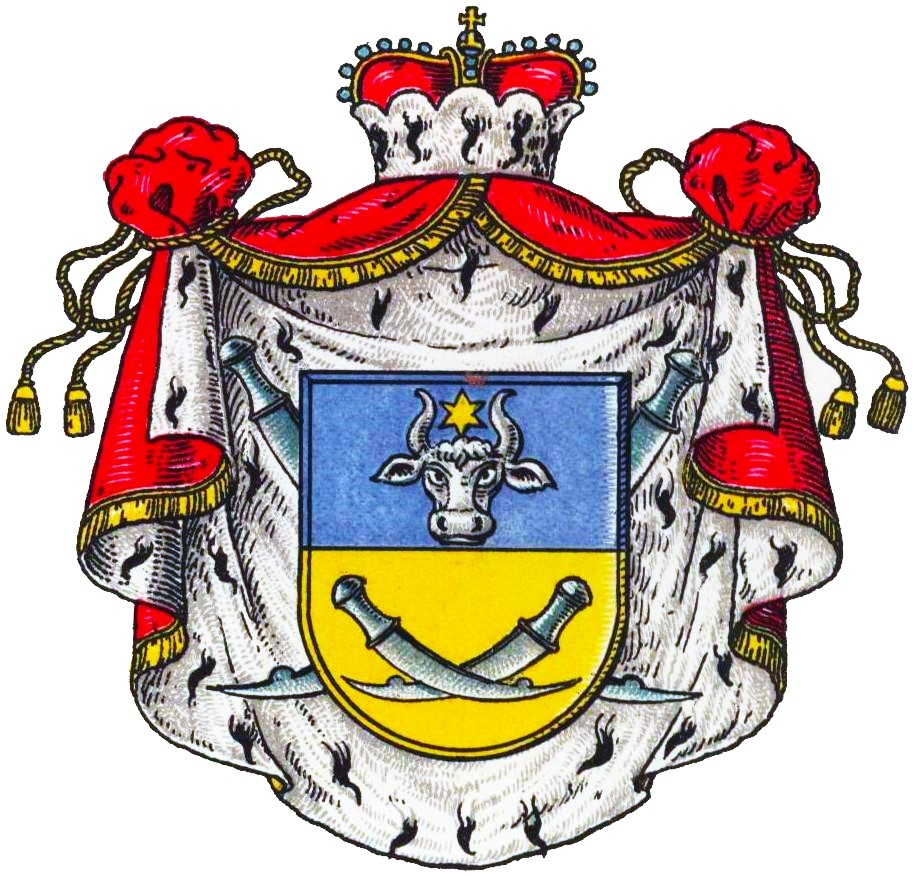
Coat of Arms of the Handjery princely family, granted into the Westphalian nobility

Handjery was born in Constantinople into an aristocratic family of mixed Phanariote Greek and Baltic German descent. He was the son of the Russian civil servant Prince Telemach Handjery and his wife Caroline, née von Glasenapp. His maternal grandfather was the Russian Imperial general Georg Johann von Glasenapp (1750–1819), and his paternal grandfather was Alexander Hangerli, a prominent Phanariote Greek dragoman of the Ottoman Empire who briefly served as Prince of Moldavia. Religiously, Handjery was of the Greek Catholic faith.

When Handjery was nine years old, his family moved to Dresden and later settled in Berlin. In Westphalia, his father purchased the manorial estates of Ulenburg, Beck, Schockenmühle, and Gohfeld before dying in 1850. Handjery was granted Prussian citizenship on 17 April 1851. Four days later, on 21 April 1851, he completed his Abitur at the Friedrich-Wilhelms-Gymnasium in Berlin, with distinction in geography, history, Latin, Greek, and French.

From 1854 to 1857, Handjery studied law at the universities of Berlin and Bonn. He graduated on 20 June 1857 with a doctorate in jurisprudence (Dr. jur.). Between 1857 and 1861, he fulfilled his military obligation in the Prussian Garde-Kürassier-Regiment, ultimately stepping down due to poor health with the rank of Sekondeleutnant (second lieutenant).

== Administrative and legal career ==
Handjery entered the Prussian legal service in 1861 as an Auskultator (judicial trainee) at the Kammergericht in Berlin. On 26 June 1863, he was appointed Kammergerichtsreferendar. Following a one-year stay in France, he passed the examination for the administrative service (Regierungsreferendar) in Potsdam on 28 May 1864 and officially entered the Prussian civil service on 11 June.

On 29 October 1867, Handjery passed the Major State Law Examination (Große Juristische Staatsprüfung) and was named Regierungsassessor on 25 November 1867. From December 1867 to March 1868, he served as acting district administrator for the Jüterbog-Luckenwalde district. Between 1868 and 1870, he served as department head for ecclesiastical and educational affairs in the regional presidency of Potsdam, concurrently acting as provisional district administrator for Kreis Teltow. In 1869, he was also assigned duties in the Prussian Ministry of Agriculture, State Domains, and Forests, as well as the Royal Police Headquarters in Berlin.

== Political and administrative service ==
=== Landrat of Kreis Teltow (1870–1885) ===
On 13 August 1870, King Wilhelm I officially appointed Handjery as Landrat of Kreis Teltow, a position he held for fifteen years.

The district encompassed the rapidly developing suburbs south of the Spree River around Berlin, including Charlottenburg, Schöneberg, Rixdorf (modern Neukölln), Wilmersdorf, and Köpenick. During his tenure, the district faced massive population growth spurred by the industrial expansion of the Gründerzeit. In response to administrative pressures, the district offices were relocated in 1871 from the rural town of Teltow into central Berlin's Tiergarten quarter.

In 1877, Handjery was appointed a royal chamberlain (Kammerherr). That same year, the burgeoning urban core of Charlottenburg was partitioned off into an independent urban district (Stadtkreis). Despite the loss of Charlottenburg, the population of Kreis Teltow more than doubled under Handjery's administration. Additionally, from December 1884 to March 1885, he served as chairman of the Brandenburg Savings Banks Association (Brandenburgischer Sparkassenverband).

=== Parliamentary career ===
In 1869, Handjery won a by-election to succeed Albrecht von Roon in the Reichstag of the North German Confederation, representing the constituency of Potsdam 10 (Teltow–Beeskow-Storkow). Following the unification of Germany in 1871, he continued to represent this seat in the imperial Reichstag until January 1874. Handjery was also a member of the Prussian House of Representatives from 1870 to 1876, and again from 1879 to 1882.

Handjery returned to the Reichstag in 1881 for the same constituency (Potsdam 10), which by then included the urban district of Charlottenburg, and held the seat until 1893. His 1881 election victory was contested before parliament amid accusations of severe electoral irregularities and coercive voter influence orchestrated in favor of the Conservative candidate. Despite colossal population growth in the Berlin suburbs, the constituency's boundaries were never reapportioned under the imperial system, benefiting conservative rural votes against urban liberal and socialist surges.

=== Regierungspräsident of Liegnitz (1885–1895) ===
On 16 March 1885, Handjery was promoted to the post of Regierungspräsident (regional government president) of the Regierungsbezirk Liegnitz in the Province of Silesia. He oversaw the regional administration for a decade until failing health forced his early retirement on 1 April 1895, at the age of 58.

== Personal life and death ==
Handjery died on 7 December 1900 in Dresden. He was buried in the Alter St.-Matthäus-Kirchhof cemetery in Schöneberg, in a family plot situated against the eastern wall of the cemetery (plot H-OE-016/019), which he had acquired following the death of his mother in 1879. His daughter, Lydia, married Georg Philippescu, Marshal of the Royal Court of the Kingdom of Romania.

== Honours ==
Handjery received several civil and state decorations throughout his career:

- Landwehr Service Award, 2nd Class (8 May 1872)
- Order of the Red Eagle:
  - 4th Class (28 July 1875)
  - 3rd Class with Bow (18 January 1887)
  - 2nd Class with Oak Leaves (23 March 1890)
  - Star to the 2nd Class with Oak Leaves (11 March 1895)
- Knight of the Order of Franz Joseph (19 September 1890)
- Commander's Cross, 1st Class of the Albert Order of the Kingdom of Saxony (30 September 1890)

== Legacy ==
Multiple thoroughfares in his former administrative district of Teltow were named in his honour:

- Handjerystraße in Berlin-Friedenau
- Handjerystraße in Berlin-Adlershof
- Prinz-Handjery-Straße in Berlin-Zehlendorf

In Berlin-Neukölln, a street named Prinz-Handjery-Straße existed from before 1877 until 1950, when it was renamed Briesestraße.
