= Tudor Vladimirescu =

Romanian politician (1780–1821)

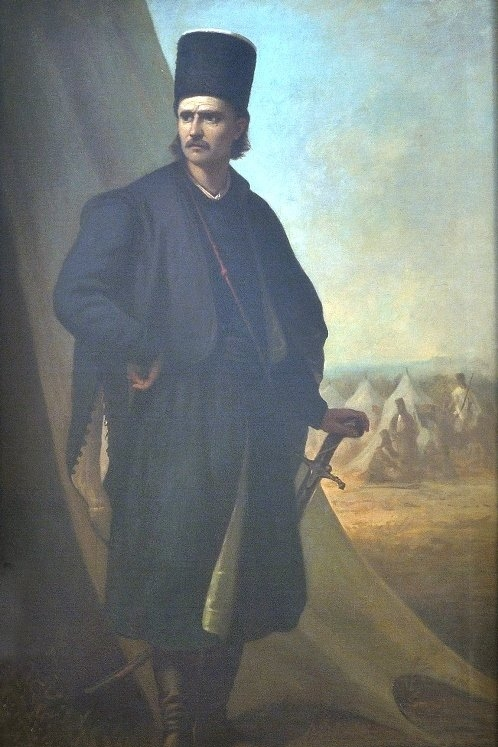
- Portrait of Tudor Vladimirescu by Theodor Aman (painted after Tudor's death, it was allegedly based on the testimonials of his Pandurs)
- Born: c. 1780; Vladimiri, Gorj County (in the region of Oltenia)
- Died: June 7, 1821 (aged 40–41); Târgoviște, Wallachia
- Other names: Tudor din Vladimiri; Domnul Tudor

Tudor Vladimirescu (Romanian pronunciation: [ˈtudor vladimiˈresku]; c. 1780 – 7 June [O.S. 26 May] 1821) was a Romanian revolutionary hero, the leader of the Wallachian uprising of 1821 and of the Pandur militia. He is also known as Tudor din Vladimiri (Tudor from Vladimiri) or, occasionally, as Domnul Tudor (Voivode Tudor).

== Background ==
Tudor was born in Vladimiri, Gorj County (in the region of Oltenia) in a family of landed peasants (mazili); his birth year is usually given as 1780, but this is still debated. At the age of 12, he was sent to Craiova, in service to boyar Ioan Glogoveanu, where he would later learn rhetoric, grammar and the Greek language. He became administrator of the boyar's estate and, in 1806, was named vătaf (leader of the local militias) at Cloșani. Tudor's experience as a servant made him familiar with customs, habits and objectives of landowners; this insight helped him walk the fine line between conflicting interests of boyars and peasants in the first months of the uprising against the Phanariotes. While leader of a mainly peasant movement, Tudor did his best not to antagonize the elite, punishing any destruction of property.

Tudor enrolled in the Russian army and took part in the Russo-Turkish War, 1806-1812. Consequently, he was awarded the Order of St. Vladimir 3rd degree and given Russian protection and immunity from prosecution under both Wallachian and Ottoman legislation (see Sudiți). This contributed to Tudor's decisions throughout the uprising, alongside his belief that Russia was backing his actions. After the war, Tudor returned to Oltenia. He traveled briefly to Vienna, in 1814, in order to attend a lawsuit involving Glogoveanu's wife's patrimony. The trip coincided with the Peace Congress, and it is believed that Vladimirescu followed the treaties' outcome.

Back in the country in 1815, Tudor learned that Ada Kaleh Ottoman garrison, who roamed Mehedinți and Gorj, had also destroyed his household from Cerneți.

From 1812 to 1821, Vladimirescu slowly built a follower base. The Pandurs respected his military skills, and many sources point out his charisma and outstanding negotiating abilities. He would also have been familiarised with the outcomes of the First and Second Serbian Uprising.

== Uprising ==
Prince Alexandros Soutzos' death in January 1821 led to the forming of a temporary Comitet de Ocârmuire ("Governing Committee"), three regents - all of them members of the most representative indigenous boyar families, of which the most prominent was Caimacam Grigore Brâncoveanu. The Comitet, motivated against competition and denied Phanariote rulers' favours, decided to quickly manoeuver anti-boyar and anti-Phanariote sentiment in Wallachia (and especially in Oltenia), acting before the newly appointed Scarlat Callimachi could claim his throne. Therefore, an agreement between it and the Pandurs was reached on the 15th: Dimitrie Macedonski was awarded the post of lieutenant to Tudor.

The very same day, Vladimirescu sent a letter to the Ottoman Court of Mahmud II, stating that his objective was not the rejection of Ottoman rule, but that of the Phanariote regime, and showing his willingness for preservation of the traditional institutions. The statements were meant to buy Tudor time against Ottoman response, as he was already in negotiations with the Greek Anti-Ottoman revolutionary society Philikí Etaireía (having probably been in contact with it from around 1819). Together, they produced a plan for insurrection, with the two Etairist representatives (Giorgakis Olympios and Iannis Pharmakis) assuring the Wallachians of Russian support for the common cause. It is apparent that Tudor was not himself a member of the Etaireía: the rigid command structure of the Brotherhood would have excluded the need for any negotiations.

After fortifying monasteries in Oltenia (Tismana, Strehaia) that were to serve him in the event of Ottoman intervention, Tudor travelled to Padeș where he issued his first proclamation (23 January). It included references to Enlightenment principles (notably, the right to resist oppression), but was also an almost millenarianist appeal to peasants, promising a "spring" to follow "winter".

In February the demands were detailed by more documents. They included: the elimination of purchased offices in the administration, with the introduction of meritocratic promotion, the suppression of certain taxes and taxing criteria, the reduction of the main tax, the founding of a Wallachian Army, and an end to internal custom duties. In line with these, Tudor asked for the banishment of some Phanariote families and forbidding future Princes to hold a retinue that would compete with local boyars for offices. Calls by boyars in the Divan for Tudor to cease such activities (expressed by envoy Nicolae Văcărescu) were met with a vehement refusal.

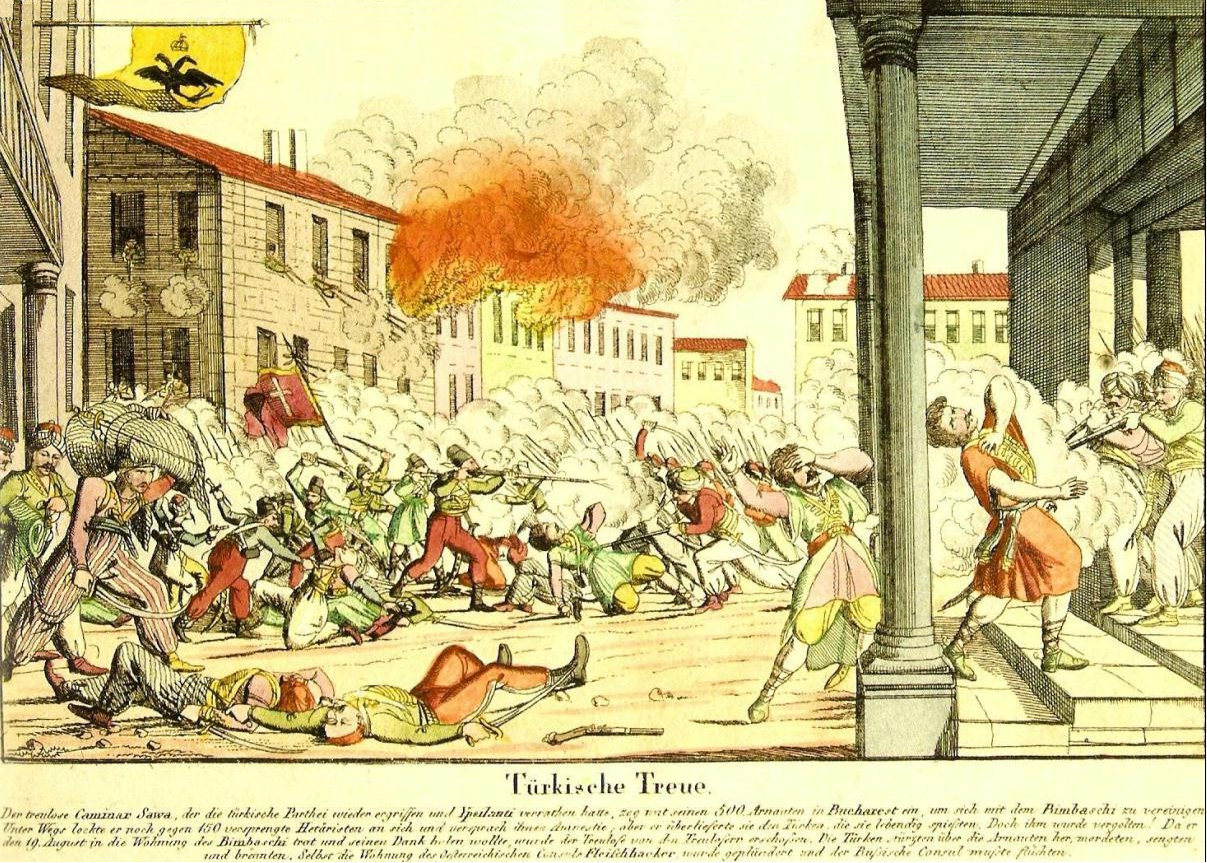
The Etaireía and Ottomans fighting in Bucharest (August 1821).

The army, swelled up in numbers as it advanced, occupied Bucharest on 21 March - here, Tudor issued another important proclamation, one that expressed yet again his commitment to peace with the Ottomans. Previously, the Philikí Etaireía under Alexander Ypsilanti had emerged in Moldavia, proclaiming a liberation from Ottoman rule that was backed by the then Moldavian Prince Michael Soutzos (see Greek War of Independence). However, this coincided with Russian reaction against Greek rebellion, with the Russian army entering Moldavia and enforcing Holy Alliance policies. Ypsilanti's army headed south, reaching Pandur-occupied Bucharest.

Tudor's actions in the meanwhile had destroyed his alliance to local boyars. He had started wearing the kalpak (a tall, cylindrical, black leather hat; see Ottoman Clothing) reserved for the Prince, and demanded to be addressed as Domn ("Master", "Prince"; cf. Domnitor) - moving away from subordination to the landowners' cause.

The meeting between Ypsilanti and Tudor brought a new compromise. Tudor considered himself liberated from the provisions of the January agreement, as Russia was now an enemy of the Etaireía; Ypsilanti tried to persuade him that Russian support was still possible. The country was divided into a Greek administration and a Wallachian one, with Tudor's declaring itself neutral in the face of large Ottoman armies preparing to cross the north of the Danube. Ottoman actions had been prompted by Russian threat of intervention in Wallachia.

Tudor's army retreated towards in Oltenia in May, as the Ottomans occupied Bucharest without meeting resistance. Tudor was no longer capable of maintaining the discipline and cohesion of his own troops, some of whom had resorted to robbery. In an attempt to ensure discipline, he imposed hangings of those found guilty. In the meantime, Etaireía members, led by Alexander Ypsilantis developed a plot to remove Tudor.

== Arrest and assassination ==
Following treason, Tudor was arrested in Golești on 21 May. On the night of 27 to 28 May, following accusations of collaboration with the Ottomans against Etaireía, he was tortured and killed by Etaireía in Târgoviște, his mutilated body being thrown into a cesspit. Tudor's collaboration with the Ottomans was never confirmed. The Etaireía did not succeed in its goal to assume command of Vladimirescu's army: most of it disbanded on the spot.

== Legacy ==
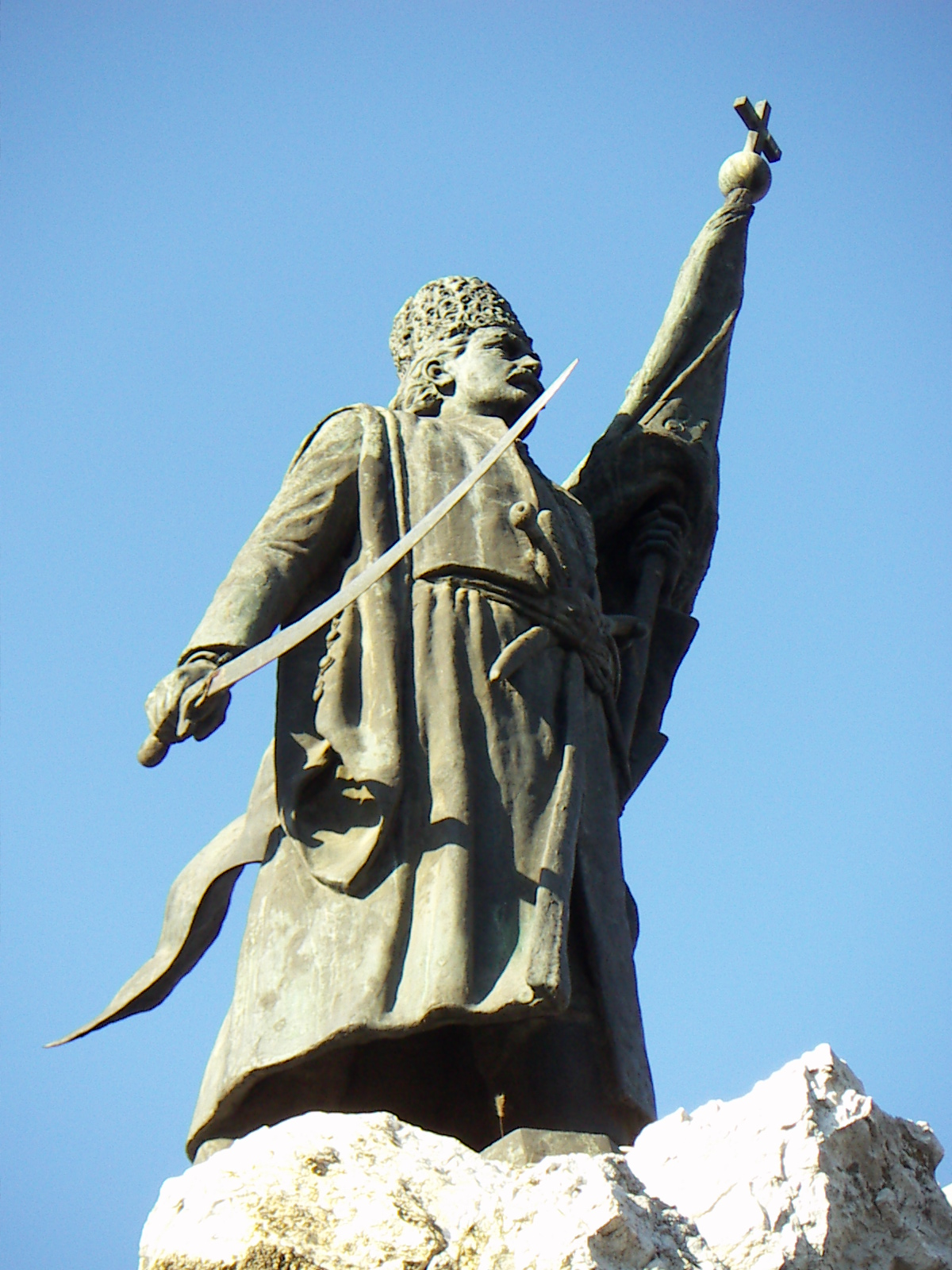
Tudor Vladimirescu statue in Târgu Jiu.

Tudor's rebellion ensured that Wallachia would stay under military occupation. Although the situation was stabilized by August, Ottoman troops remained until 1826. However, as they could no longer trust Phanariote rule in the face of its infiltration by Greek nationalism (Ypsilanti himself came from a Phanariote family - see Alexander Ypsilanti, his grandfather, and Constantine Ypsilanti, his father), the Ottomans returned the two Principalities to rule by and through locals (in 1822): Grigore IV Ghica in Wallachia, Ioan Sturdza (Ioniţă Sandu Sturdza) in Moldavia. The changes in the situation were to be confirmed by the Treaty of Adrianople and Russian occupation (at the end of the Russo-Turkish War).

Although the scope of his movement appealed to generations of Romanian nationalists, Tudor Vladimirescu's most favorable treatment came with the official ideology of the Romanian People's Republic (the first period of Communist Romania, lasting from 1948 to 1965). He was considered progressive, and it also contributed that he viewed himself as an ally to the Russian cause—almost as a precursor of the Soviet alliance. The Romanian film Tudor (1962) narrated his life from the return home in 1812 to his death. Tudor, portrayed by Emanoil Petruţ, falls from his horse after being shot in the back, claiming to return "as the grass of spring" - a far easier death than what Vladimirescu had endured in reality.

A division bearing his name (Divizia Tudor Vladimirescu) was formed by the Red Army with Romanian prisoners of war who had fought on the Eastern Front. They were called on to fight the Ion Antonescu pro-Nazi Germany regime, and were absorbed into the Romanian Army after 1944. The division had its precedent in an artillery battery of the same name, grouping Romanian volunteers in the International Brigades during the Spanish Civil War. An Order of Tudor Vladmirescu was also created in 1966 and awarded to Romanian civilians and military personnel for contributions to the establishment of a socialist Romania, it could also be awarded to foreigners. There are multiple streets and structures in Romania bearing his name, including a metro station in Bucharest. From its founding in 1951 to 1974, the Rocar factory in Bucharest was called the Tudor Vladimirescu Works and during this time the Tudor Vladimirescu van range (usually shortened to TV) was made from 1958 to 1996 along with a bus range from 1959 to 1976.

The day Vladimirescu entered Bucharest, 21 March, is now celebrated in Oltenia as Oltenia Day, which was promulgated on 13 April 2017 by the President of Romania Klaus Iohannis.

== Quotes ==
- [In the Padeş proclamation:] "There is no law that would prevent a man from meeting evil with evil."
- [To boyar Nicolae Văcărescu:] "It seems to me that you, sir, consider the folk, whose blood has been feeding and giving lustre to all the boyar kin, to be, in fact, nothing and that you only view the pillagers to be the motherland... But, how come you, sir, do not consider the motherland to be, in fact, the people, and not the pillagers' clique?"
- [To the Porte:] "[The Wallachians have rebelled because] of the terrible sufferings they are caused by the union between the native boyars and those who have for long been sent as rulers and legislators of this people."
- [Answering Ypsilanti's question regarding the liberty he had taken to govern in Bucharest:] "[I act] on the basis of the right given to me by my own sword."

| Preceded by Alexandru Suţu | Ruler of Wallachia; March – May 1821 | Succeeded by Scarlat Callimachi |
