= Alter St.-Matthäus-Kirchhof =

Cemetery in Berlin, Germany

Coordinates: 52.4903°N 13.3669°E

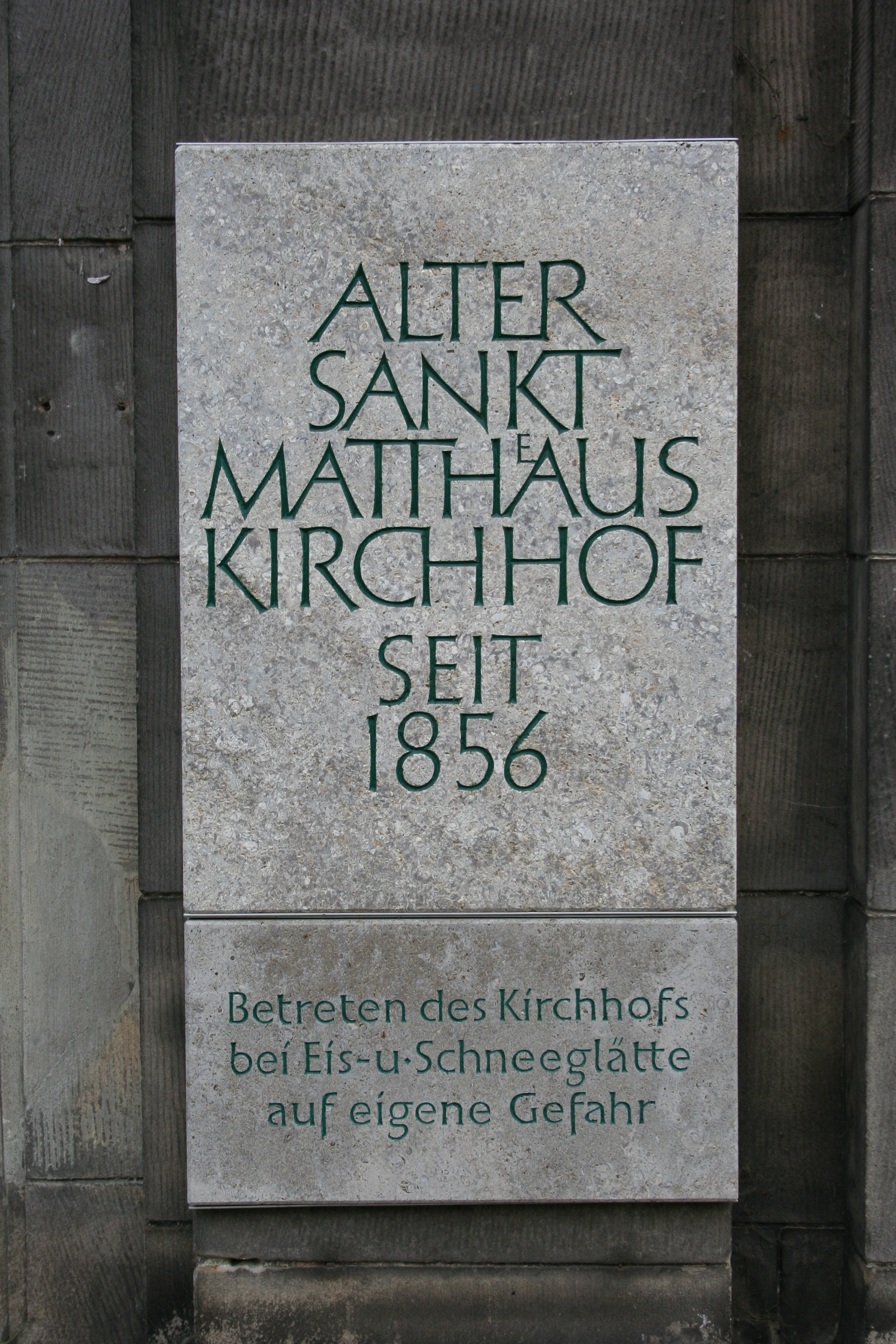

Alter St.-Matthäus-Kirchhof (Alter Sankt-Matthäus-Kirchhof or Old St. Matthew's Churchyard) is a cemetery in Schöneberg, Berlin, Germany. It was established in 1856 by the Protestant parish of St. Matthew. It is known for its interment of the Brothers Grimm, Rudolf Virchow, Talaat Pasha, and Claus von Stauffenberg. As for Stauffenberg, his corpse was exhumed by the SS on 22 July 1944, the day after his burial, and cremated to remove any traces of him. His tombstone, however, remains intact.

== History ==
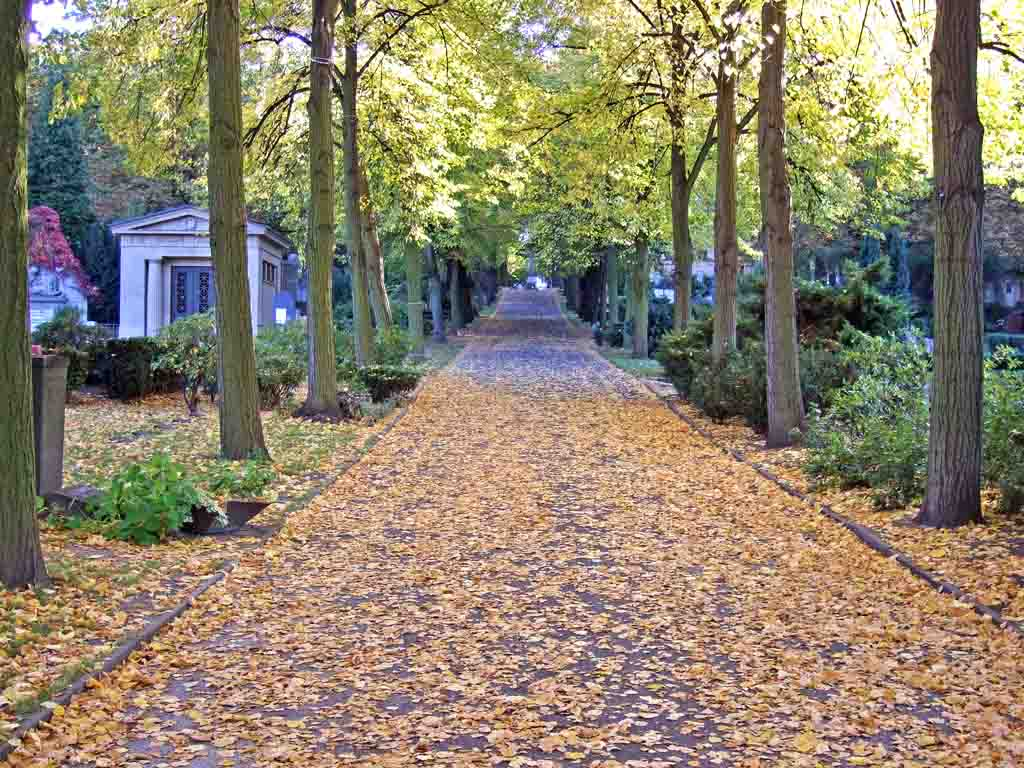
Way through the cemetery

A Protestant parish named St. Matthäus (St. Matthew) was established in 1846 in southern Tiergarten area of Schöneberg. With the growing residents of eminent officials and scientists by the late 19th century, it became known as the "Privy Councilor's Quarters". The parish acquired a plot of land on the nearby hillside for their cemetery in 1854. It was first used for the purpose on 25 March 1856. It soon attracted even non-parishioners so that it had to be extended by 1883. To raise its value, interment fee for non-parishioners was increased in 1877. Due to impending saturation of the space, it was approved in 1890 that only the parishioners could use the cemetery. For non-parishioners, a new cemetery was created near the city. In 1909, a concrete funeral chapel was established in place of a small wooden chapel built in 1876. The artistic designs of the graveyard and chapel reflects the works of architects, sculptors, and artisans of the Prussian Empire. The German Reichstag planned to expand Berlin with demolition of the cemetery under Albert Speers' project. During 1938–1939, the northern section, covering one-third of the area, was demolished. The rest was to be done away by 1941. The government's investment in World War II led to loss of attention to the plan. However, a number of graves were destroyed as Berlin was ravaged by the Allies towards the end of the war. The surrounding area, located between three rail lines, is known as "Red Island" as it served as a hotspot for anti-Nazi resistance. The parish was dissolved in 2001, and the cemetery was taken over by the Evangelische Zwölf-Apostel-Kirchengemeinde (The Twelve Apostle Church) of Berlin. The City of Berlin had declared about 60 graves as heritage sites.

== Important burials ==
Year	Name	Notability	Image	Grave
1859	Wilhelm Grimm of Brothers Grimm	Academic, linguist, cultural researcher, lexicographer, author, folklorist. Known for tales such as Cinderella (Aschenputtel), The Frog Prince (Der Froschkönig), Hansel and Gretel (Hänsel und Gretel), Rapunzel, Rumpelstiltskin (Rumpelstilzchen), and Snow White (Schneewittchen).		
1863	Jakob Grimm, the older Brothers Grimm	As above	On right above	On right above
1887	Gustav Kirchhoff	Theoretical physicist who identified black-body radiation and posited Kirchhoff's laws		
1891	Leopold Kronecker with wife Fanni Kronecker	Professor of Mathematics at Berlin University		
1900	Nicolaus Handjery	Member of the Reichstag (German Empire)		
1902	Rudolf Virchow and wife Rose Virchow	Medical doctor, anthropologist, pathologist, biologist, politician; discoverer of the third tenet of cell theory, leukemia, chordoma, ochronosis. Variously known as "father of modern pathology", "father of modern medicine" or "father of social medicine".		
1920	Max Bruch and wife Clara Bruch	German Romantic composer, teacher, and conductor who wrote over 200 works, including three violin concertos, the first of which has become a staple of the violin repertoire.		
1921	Talaat Pasha (assassination of Talaat Pasha)	Ottoman grand vizier, main perpetrator of the Armenian genocide. Exhumed in 1943 and reburied in Istanbul.		
1944	Claus von Stauffenberg	German Army Colonel and executioner of the Operation Valkyrie to assassinate Adolf Hitler		
2018	Graciano Rocchigiani	German professional boxer		
