= Gregory Callimachi =

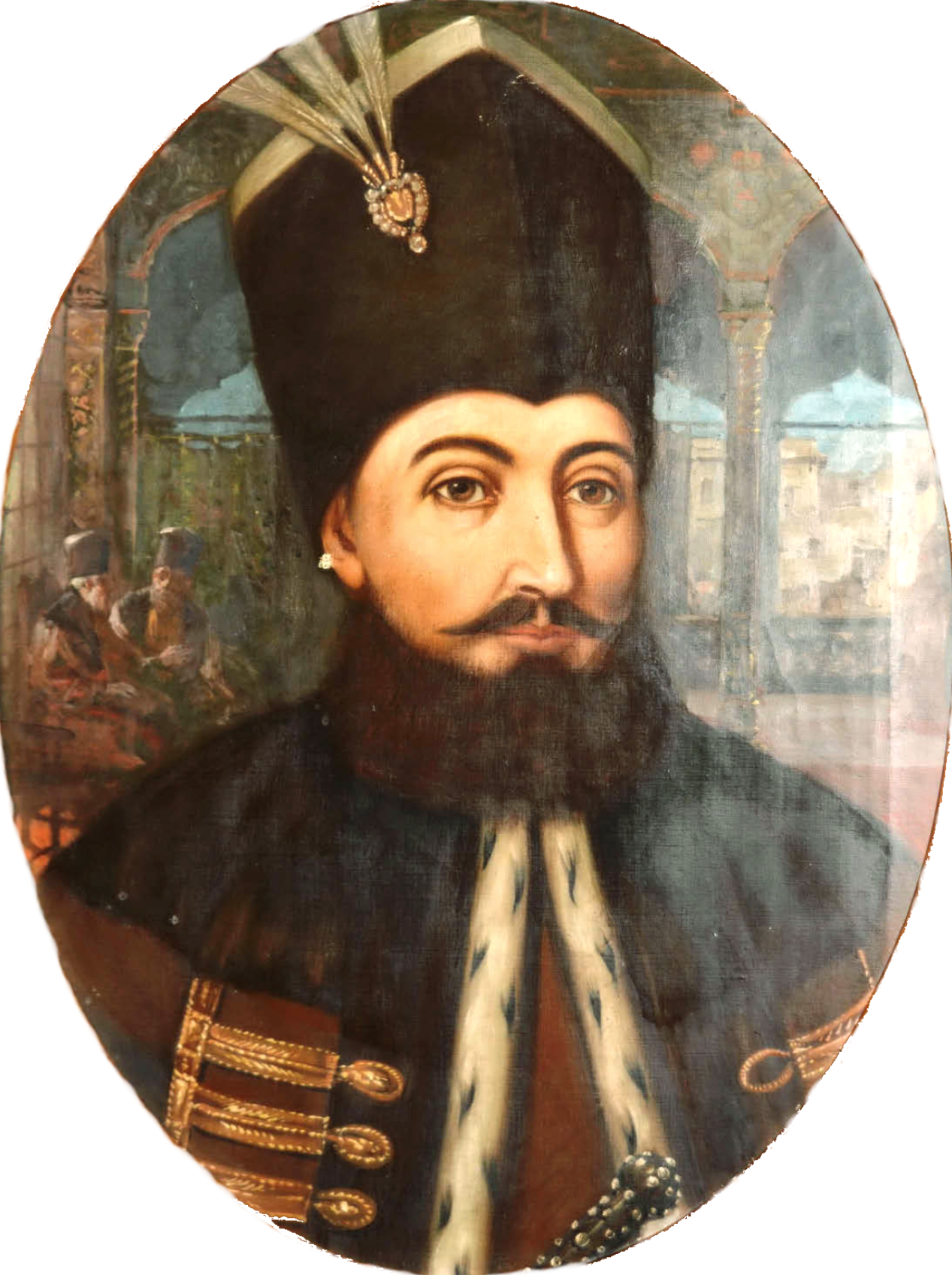

Prince of Moldavia
- Reign: 11 June 1761 – 29 March 1764
- Predecessor: Ioan Teodor Callimachi
- Successor: Grigore III Ghica

Prince of Moldavia
- Reign: 3 February 1767 – 14 June 1769
- Predecessor: Grigore III Ghica
- Successor: Constantine Mavrocordatos
- Born: 1735
- Died: 9 September 1769 (aged 33–34); Istanbul
- House: Callimachi family
- Father: Ioan Teodor Callimachi
- Mother: Ralitsa Chrysoskoléos
- Religion: Orthodox
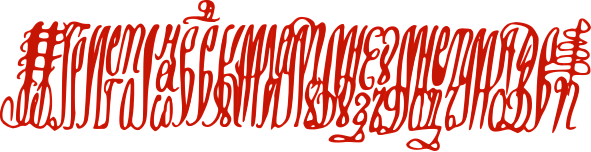
- Signature

Gregory Callimachi (Romanian: Grigore Callimachi, Greek: Γρηγόριος Καλλιμάχης; 1735 – 9 September 1769) was a Phanariote who served as Prince of Moldavia from 1761 to 1764, and 1767 to 1769.

== Origin ==
Gregory Callimachi was the son of the Grand Dragoman, and then Prince of Moldavia, John Theodore Callimachi, and Ralitsa Chrysoskoleos. He became hospodar of Moldavia as successor of his father in May 1761. Replaced by Grigore III Ghica in March 1764, he returned to his throne in January 1767.

== Reign ==
It was the Russo-Turkish War of 1768-1774 that led to his death: accused of collusion with the Russian Empire, he was deposed in June 1769 and sent to Istanbul where he was tried and sentenced to death for treason with the Grand Dragoman Nicolas Soutzo and the Grand Vizier Yağlıkçızade Mehmed Emin Pasha. In September 1769, Callimachi was tied up and his severed head exposed to the Bâb-ı Hümâyûn, that is to say to the outer door of the Topkapı Palace, with a yafta (explanatory notice) specifying his crimes.

== Family ==
Gregory Callimachi married Helena Mavrocordatos, from whom he had two children:

- Smaragda, wife in 1788 of Alexander Hangerli, hospodar of Moldavia.
- Mariora (1762-1822), wife of the logothete Grigore Sturdza, of whom she had Mihail Sturdza, future prince of Moldavia.

== Sources ==
- Alexandru Dimitrie Xenopol Histoire des Roumains de la Dacie trajane : Depuis les origines jusqu'à l'union des principautés. E Leroux Paris (1896)
- Nicolas Iorga Histoire des Roumains et de la romanité orientale. (1920)
- (in Romanian) Constantin C. Giurescu & Dinu C. Giurescu, Istoria Românilor Volume III (depuis 1606), éd. Ştiinţifică şi Enciclopedică, Bucarest, 1977.
- Matei Cazacu, chapitre La mort infâme dans Les Ottomans et la mort de Gilles Veinstein 1996, ISBN 9004105050.
- Joëlle Dalegre Grecs et Ottomans 1453-1923. De la chute de Constantinople à la fin de l’Empire Ottoman, L’Harmattan 2002, ISBN 2747521621.
- Jean Nouzille La Moldavie, Histoire tragique d'une région européenne, éd. Bieler 2004, ISBN 2-9520012-1-9.
- Traian Sandu, Histoire de la Roumanie, éd. Perrin 2008.

Preceded by John Theodore Callimachi	Prince of Moldavia; 1761–1764	Succeeded by Grigore III Ghica
Preceded by Grigore III Ghica	Prince of Moldavia; 1767–1769	Succeeded by Constantine Mavrocordatos
