= Solomon Negima =

Palestinian dragoman active in Palestine and Syria (c. 1885–1933)

Solomon Negima (died July 1933) was a Palestinian dragoman active in Palestine, Syria, and Egypt from the mid-1880s until his death. He is known primarily through a testimonial book compiled by his clients and analysed by historian Rachel Mairs in From Khartoum to Jerusalem: The Dragoman Solomon Negima and His Clients (1885–1933). His career is typical of the role of local intermediaries in the expanding tourist and pilgrimage economy of the late Ottoman eastern Mediterranean.

== Early life and military service ==
Negima was born to Christian parents, with family origins in the Galilee region and in what is now Jordan. In 1884 he was employed by British forces in Egypt during the Nile Expedition. A surviving reference describes him as headman in No. 9 Company of the Transport and Commissariat Corps, noting that he could read and write Arabic and speak English "fairly well", and recommending him as an interpreter.

Negima was later recorded as entitled to campaign honours for "Nile 1884–85" and "Abu Klea". He was also entitled to the Khedive's Star, awarded to holders of British medals for the Egyptian and Sudanese campaigns, although Mairs notes that he may not have received it or subsequently lost it. His wartime experience and medals later formed part of the professional persona he presented to clients.

== Career as dragoman ==
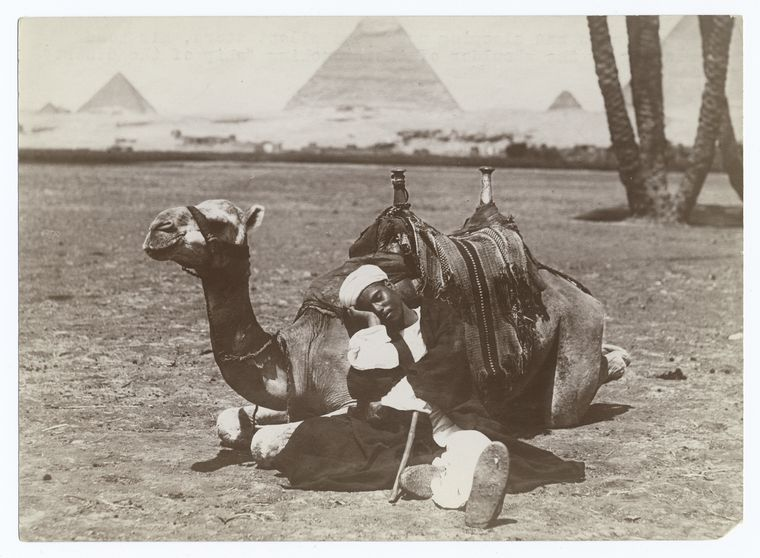
A dragoman resting on his camel, illustrating the profession in the eastern Mediterranean.

By the late 1880s Negima was working as a professional dragoman based primarily in Jaffa and Jerusalem. Dragomans acted as guides, interpreters, and logistical organisers for foreign visitors, arranging transport, securing accommodation, negotiating access to religious sites, managing servants and provisions, and providing translation and local knowledge. Historians note that dragomans also shaped travellers' understanding of the biblical landscape by interpreting sites, traditions, and local histories for European and American pilgrims seeking to connect the physical geography of Palestine with the narratives of the Bible.

The growth of steamship travel, missionary networks, and biblical tourism in the nineteenth century increased demand for professional guides in Palestine. Historians have described dragomans as central figures in mediating encounters between European and American travellers and local communities. Their position required linguistic skills, familiarity with religious traditions, and the ability to navigate Ottoman administrative structures and local social norms.

Some of Negima's earliest identifiable clients travelled with him in 1888 and 1889. Among them were Ellen E. Miller and the Reverend Joseph Llewellyn Thomas, both of whom later published accounts of their journeys. These accounts refer to Negima's military background and to his display of medals and military-style dress. Thomas wrote that Negima claimed to have been present at Abu Klea and Metemmeh and that he showed his medals as confirmation.

Negima maintained a testimonial book in which clients wrote letters of recommendation, a common practice among guides competing for travellers in late nineteenth-century Palestine. One preserved letter from H. Milner Black, dated 20 May 1891, certified that Negima had served as dragoman in Judea and had fulfilled his duties "to my entire satisfaction".

== Clients and religious travel ==
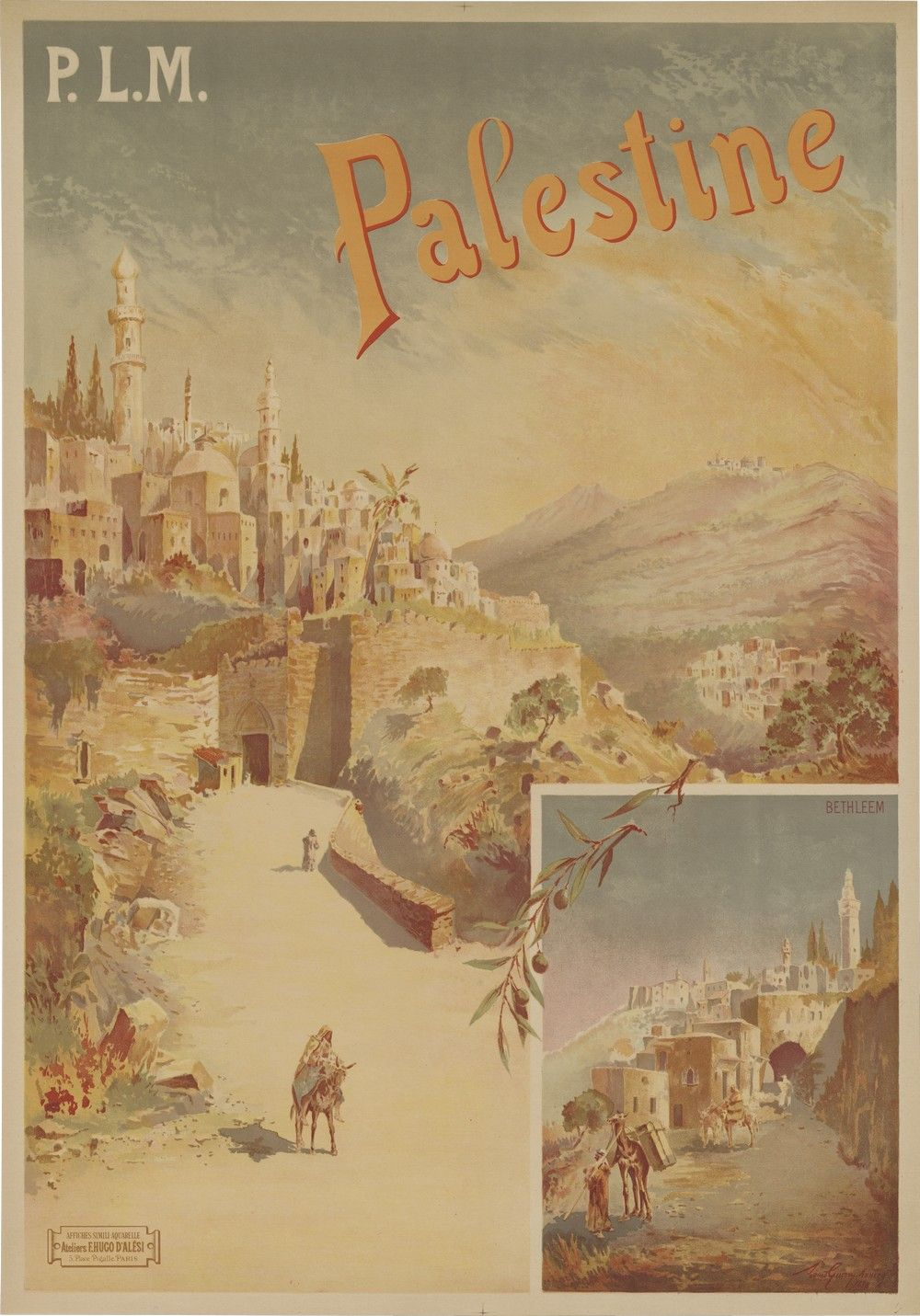
Travel poster advertising Palestine, reflecting the wider tourist world in which dragomans such as Negima worked.

Negima guided a range of travellers, including clergy and missionaries from Britain, Ireland, Australia, and the United States. In March 1895 he guided a group that may have included Ernest Henry Cornwall Lewis-Crosby, later Dean of Christ Church Cathedral, Dublin, who subsequently drew on his experiences in sermons and lectures.

Negima also guided Charles T. Walker, a Baptist minister from Augusta, Georgia. Walker later published A Colored Man Abroad (1892), describing his journey in Palestine and the wider region. Walker referred to travelling with Negima as dragoman and guard, riding in front while provisions were carried behind.

Clerical tourism formed a significant portion of late nineteenth-century travel to Palestine, and dragomans were expected to provide biblical commentary alongside logistical support, reinforcing the connection between pilgrimage, scholarship, and tourism.

== Gender, supervision and professional roles ==
Travel accounts associated with Negima indicate that he sometimes assumed responsibility for supervising accommodation and security arrangements, particularly for women travelling independently. Such responsibilities reflected broader expectations placed on dragomans to manage propriety, safety, and negotiation in unfamiliar environments.

Contemporary commentary occasionally addressed relations between European women and local attendants. Mairs cites a 1904 newspaper item quoting the novelist Marmaduke Pickthall, who cautioned European women about familiarity with English-speaking guides. These discussions formed part of wider debates about gender, respectability, and cross-cultural contact in imperial travel contexts.

== Networks and later life ==
Negima operated within networks of local guides serving an expanding tourist infrastructure. He was associated with Rolla Floyd, an American resident of Palestine who also worked as a dragoman. A contemporary review describes Floyd as a prominent guide of his generation.

After retiring from active guiding, Negima remained in Jerusalem, where he later lived and worked with members of the Reorganized Church of Jesus Christ of Latter Day Saints. He died in July 1933.

== Historical significance ==
Negima did not leave a personal archive, and knowledge of his life derives primarily from his testimonial book and from travel narratives written by his clients. Mairs uses these materials to examine the role of dragomans as intermediaries in late Ottoman Palestine and to explore how guides shaped travellers' experiences and published accounts.

Studies of nineteenth-century Palestine emphasise that dragomans were integral to the development of tourism and pilgrimage infrastructure, mediating linguistic, cultural, and administrative boundaries. Modern commentary has also drawn attention to the lives of dragomans and their role in shaping travel narratives and cross-cultural encounters.Irving, Sarah (7 February 2017). "The untold lives of dragomen". Electronic Intifada.

Negima's preserved testimonials provide a rare example of such a guide documented across several decades of work.

== Works cited ==
- Mairs, Rachel (2016). From Khartoum to Jerusalem: The Dragoman Solomon Negima and His Clients (1885–1933). London: Bloomsbury. ISBN 9781474255028.
- Ben-Arieh, Yehoshua (1979). Jerusalem in the 19th Century: The Old City. Yad Izhak Ben-Zvi.
- Kark, Ruth; Goren, Haim (2003). "The Dragomans of Palestine in the Nineteenth Century". Middle Eastern Studies.
- Shamir, Ron (2006). "The Rise of Professional Tourism in the Late Ottoman Empire". Comparative Studies in Society and History.
- Schick, Robert (2016). "An American Dragoman in Palestine". Common-place. 16 (1).
