= Nassif Mallouf =

Lebanese lexicographer

Nāṣīf ibn Ilyās Munʿim al-Maʿlūf (Arabic: ناصيف بن إلياس منعم المعلوف; 20 March 1823 – 14 May 1865), commonly known in the West as Nassif Mallouf, was a Lebanese lexicographer. He was a member of the Société Asiatique, a professor of Eastern literature at the Collège de la Propagande at Smyrna, and Secretary-Interpreter to the irregular Anglo-Ottoman cavalry. Besides Arabic, his mother tongue, he was learned in Persian, Turkish, English, French, Modern Greek and Italian.

== Life ==
Mallouf was born in the village of Zabbougha, then in the Ottoman Empire.

He was educated in a convent on Mt. Lebanon. His mother tongue was Arabic, and to this he soon added Persian and Turkish. He learned the principal European languages at a missionary school in Smyrna, and was in 1845 appointed professor of oriental tongues in the Lazarist college of the propaganda in that city. It was there that he composed the greater part of numerous works, including the Liçani turkinin anakhtaridir, or "Key of the Turkish Language" (Smyrna, 1848); Plaisanteries de Nasr Eddin Khodja, with the Turkish text (Smyrna, 1849; Paris, 1856); and several grammars, dictionaries, and elementary works in French, with their Persian, Arabic, and Turkish correlatives. During the Crimean war Mallouf was the first secretary-interpreter of Lord Raglan, and was officially employed to teach Turkish to the English officers.

As worded by Charles Malouf Samaha, after Lord Raglan's death in 1855, he was a dragoman under General Beatson.

== Publications ==
- Liçani turkinin anakhtaridir ou Clef de la langue turque, 1848
- Dictionnaire de poche français-turc, ou, Trésor de la conversation, 1849
- "Fevaydi-charqiyè", ou Abrégé de grammaire orientale turque, arabe et persane, expliquée en langue turque, 1854
- Dictionnaire français-turc: avec la prononciation figurée, 1856
- Nouveau guide de la conversation en quatre langues: italien, grec-moderne, français et anglais, 1859
- Plaisanteries de Khodja Nasr-ed-din Efendi, 1859
- Guide en trois langues : française, anglaise et turque, 1860
- Grammaire élémentaire de la Langue Turque suivie de dialogues familiers avec la prononciation figurée et d'un petit secrétaire ou modèle de lettres avec la traduction française en regard, 1862
- Dictionnaire turc-français: Avec la prononciation figurée. II - Volume 2, 1867

== Sources ==
- Malouf Samaha, Charles (2010). Nassif Mallouf: dragoman and orientalist (1823–1865). ISBN 9789754283976.
