= Scarlat Callimachi (hospodar) =

Prince of Moldavia in 1806 and 1807–10

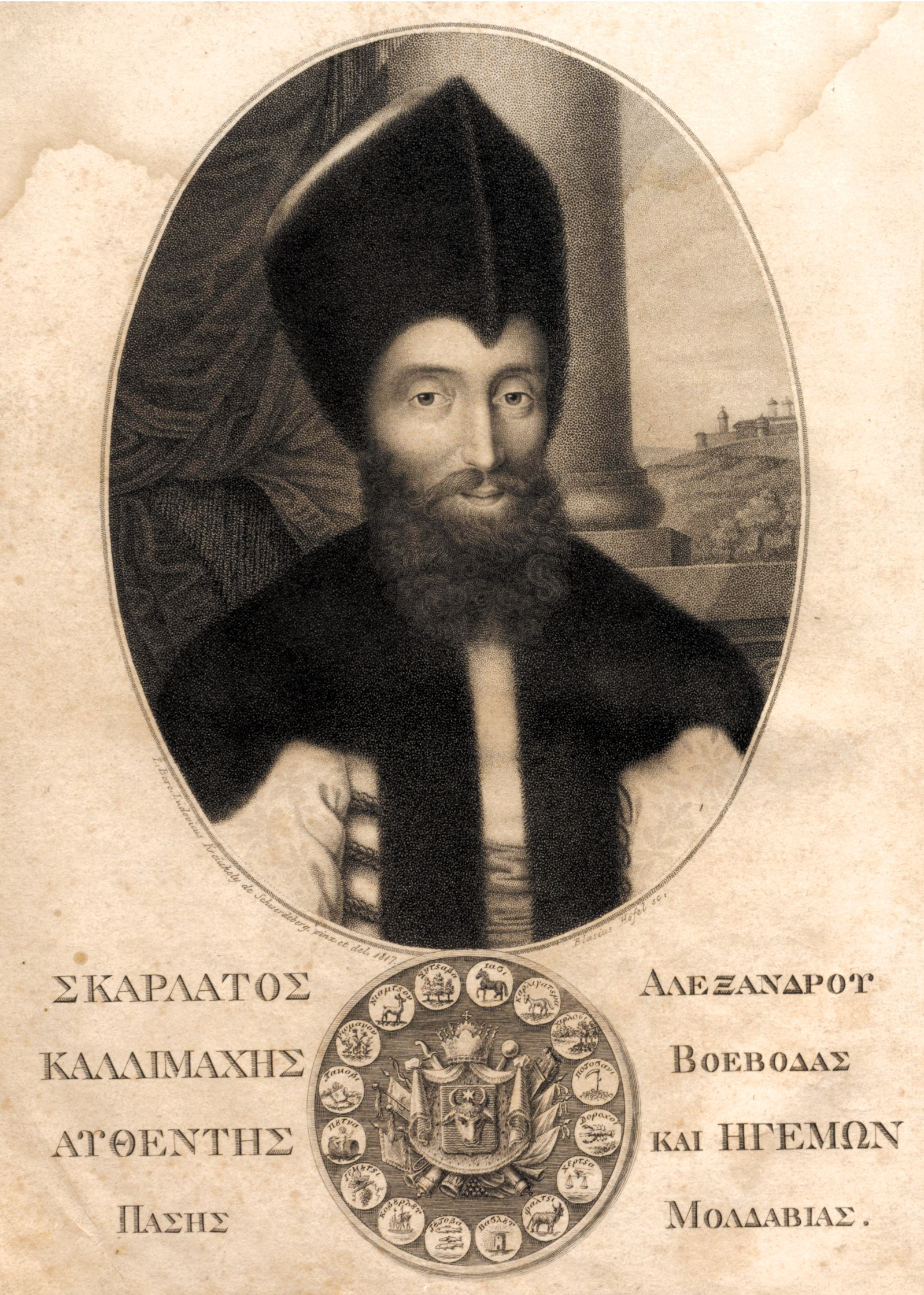
- Dedicatory portrait of Callimachi from his Political Code of the Principality of Moldavia (1816–17)

Prince of Moldavia (1st reign)
- Reign: 24 August 1806 – 26 October 1806
- Predecessor: Alexander Mourouzis
- Successor: Alexander Mourouzis

Prince of Moldavia (2nd reign)
- Reign: 4 August 1807 – 13 June 1810
- Predecessor: Alexander Hangerli
- Successor: Iordache Ruset-Roznovanu

Prince of Moldavia (3rd reign)
- Reign: 17 September 1812 – June 1819
- Predecessor: Veniamin Costache
- Successor: Michael Soutzos

Prince of Wallachia
- Reign: February – June 1821
- Predecessor: Tudor Vladimirescu
- Successor: Grigore IV Ghica
- Born: 1773; Istanbul, Ottoman Empire
- Died: 12 December 1821 (aged 47-48); Bolu, Ottoman Empire
- House: Callimachi family
- Religion: Orthodox

Scarlat Callimachi (Greek: Σκαρλάτος Καλλιμάχης; 1773 – 12 December 1821) was Grand Dragoman of the Sublime Porte 1801–1806, Prince of Moldavia between August 24, 1806 – October 26, 1806, August 4, 1807 – June 13, 1810, September 17, 1812 – June 1819 and Prince of Wallachia between February 1821 – June 1821.

== Service in the Russo-Turkish War and captivity in Kharkiv ==
A member of the Callimachi family, he was the son of Alexandru Callimachi and Ruxandra Ghica, and married Smaragda Mavrogheni. In 1810, during the Russo-Turkish War, he was imprisoned by the Russians, and taken to Kharkiv. He regained the Moldovan throne in 1812. Scarlat Callimachi adopted new laws and cut taxes for the boyars. He took measures against the plague, maintained upkeep of wood paved streets, supported Gheorghe Asachi's Romanian-language movement, and introduced potatoes to Moldavia.

== Suspicion of supporting the Greek War of Independence and death by poisoning ==
In 1819 Scarlat Callimachi was taken to Istanbul to be executed after being suspected of collaborating with the Russians. He managed to have the sentence cancelled and in 1821 was appointed by the Porte to be Hospodar of Wallachia. He was Prince de jure for a few months in 1821 and was unable to claim the throne. The Greek War of Independence broke out in 1821, and Callimachi died poisoned later that year, under suspicion of being pro-Greek.

Preceded by Alexandru Moruzi	Ruler of Moldavia; 1806	Succeeded by Alexandru Moruzi
Preceded by Alexandru Hangerli	Ruler of Moldavia; 1807–1810	Succeeded by Iordache Ruset-Roznovanu
Preceded by Veniamin Costache	Ruler of Moldavia; 1812–1819	Succeeded by Mihail Sutu
Preceded by Tudor Vladimirescu	Ruler of Wallachia; 1821	Succeeded by Grigore IV Ghica
