= Constantine Ypsilantis =

Prince of Moldavia from 1799 to 1801

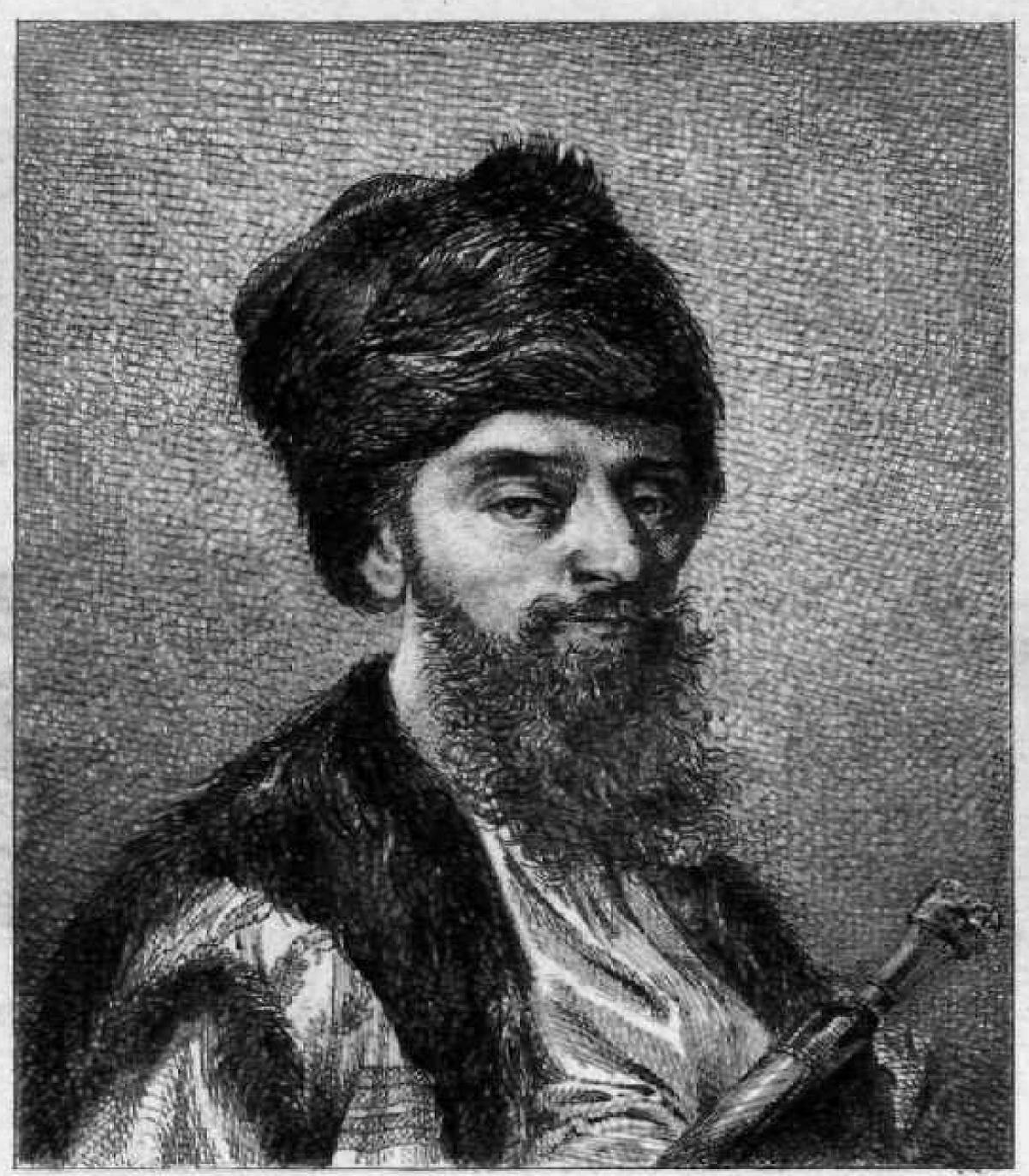

Prince of Moldavia
- Reign: 9 March 1799 – 4 July 1801
- Predecessor: Alexandru Callimachi
- Successor: Alexandros Soutzos

Prince of Wallachia (1st reign)
- Reign: 1 September 1802 – August 1806
- Predecessor: Alexandros Soutzos
- Successor: John Caradja

Prince of Wallachia (2nd reign)
- Reign: 27 December 1806 – 31 May 1807
- Predecessor: Alexandros Soutzos
- Successor: Russian occupation
- Born: 1760; Constantinople, Ottoman Empire (modern-day Istanbul, Turkey)
- Died: 24 June 1816 (aged 55–56); Kiev, Russian Empire
- Spouse: Ralu Callimachi
- Issue: Alexander Ypsilantis; Demetrios Ypsilantis; Eleni Ypsilanti; Nikolaos Ypsilantis; Georgios Ypsilantis; Grigorios Ypsilantis; Ekaterini Ypsilanti; Maria Ypsilanti
- Father: Alexander Ypsilantis
- Religion: Eastern Orthodox

Constantine Ypsilantis (Greek: Κωνσταντίνος Υψηλάντης Konstantinos Ypsilantis; Romanian: Constantin Ipsilanti; 1760 – 24 June 1816) was the son of Alexander Ypsilantis, a key member of an important Phanariote family, Grand Dragoman of the Porte (1796–1799), hospodar of Moldavia (1799–1802) and Wallachia (1802–1806), and a Prince through marriage to the daughter of Alexandru Callimachi.

== In Ottoman service ==
Constantine Ypsilantis served as Grand Dragoman of the Ottoman government in 1796–1799, in conjunction with his father's appointment as Prince of Moldavia. He played a role in turning the Ottoman Empire against Revolutionary France, culminating in its joining the Second Coalition, and sponsored the occupation of the French-ruled Ionian Islands and the creation of the Septinsular Republic. In this post, he also translated three French military manuals for the reformed Nizam-i Djedid Army then being created by Sultan Selim III.

== Resistance against the Ottoman Empire ==
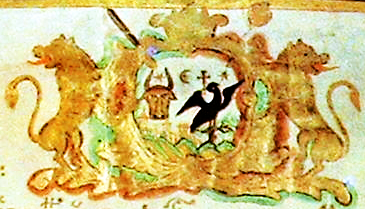
Ypsilantis Coat of Arms (1805)

Ypsilantis had joined in a conspiracy to liberate Greece and, on its discovery, fled to Vienna, had been pardoned by the sultan and in 1799 appointed by him hospodar of Moldavia. Deposed in 1805, he escaped to St Petersburg, and in 1806, at the head of some 20,000 Russians, returned to Bucharest, where he set to work on a fresh attempt to liberate Greece.

== Union of Moldavia and Wallachia ==
From 1806, during Russian occupation of the Principalities of Moldavia and Wallachia, Russia encouraged their provisional union under Prince Constantine Ypsilanti. Russia preferred their union for improved relations with the Principalities and their formal union was planned for 1830.

Ypsilantis's plans were ruined by the Peace of Tilsit and in 1807 he emigrated with his family to Russia.

== Legacy ==
Ypsilantis died, in Kiev, where he had served as commandant of the Pechersk Fortress since 1807. He left five sons, of whom two played a conspicuous part in the Greek War of Independence: Alexander and Demetrios.

== Sources ==
- East, The Union of Moldavia and Wallachia, 1859 – An Episode in Diplomatic History, Thirlwall Prize Essay for 1927, Cambridge University Press (1929).
- Philliou, Christine M. (2011). Biography of an Empire: Governing Ottomans in an Age of Revolution. Berkeley, Los Angeles and London: University of California Press. ISBN 978-0-520-26633-9.
- Stamatiadis, Epameinondas (1865). Βιογραφίαι τῶν Ἑλλήνων Μεγάλων Διερμηνέων τοῡ Ὀθωμανικοῡ Κράτους [Biographies of the Greek Great Dragomans of the Ottoman State] (in Greek). Athens: K. Tefarikis.
- Strauss, Johann (1995). "The Millets and the Ottoman Language: The Contribution of Ottoman Greeks to Ottoman Letters (19th–20th Centuries)". Die Welt des Islams. 35 (2): 189–249. doi:10.1163/1570060952597860.

Preceded by George Mourouzis	Grand Dragoman of the Porte; 1796–1799	Succeeded by Alexandros Soutzos
Preceded by Alexandru Callimachi	Prince of Moldavia; 1799–1801	Succeeded by Alexandros Soutzos
Preceded by Alexandros Soutzos	Prince of Wallachia; 1802–1806	Succeeded by Russian occupation
