= Dora d'Istria =

Romanian writer (1828–1888)

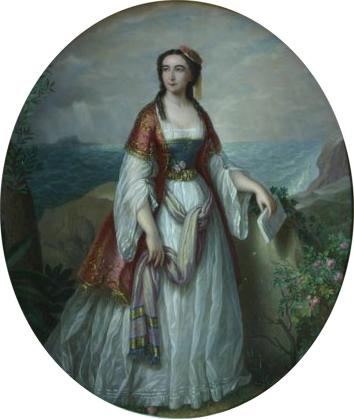
- Portrait of Dora d'Istria by Petre Mateescu (1876)
- Born: 22 January 1828; Bucharest, Wallachia
- Died: 17 November 1888 (aged 60); Florence, Kingdom of Italy
- Occupations: Poet and writer
- Writing career
- Genre: Romanticism
- Notable awards: Honor of the Nation
- Movement: Albanian National Awakening

Dora d'Istria, pen name of Duchess Helena Koltsova-Massalskaya, born Elena Ghica (Gjika) (22 January 1828 in Bucharest – 17 November 1888 in Florence), was a Romanian Romantic writer and feminist of Albanian origin. She was an advocate for the Albanian national cause of the 19th century, and promoted the Albanian struggle for independence in Western Europe, despite not knowing the Albanian language herself. Her writings and efforts gained recognition among Albanian nationalist circles, and her name was used to garner support for the cause.

== Life ==
She was born in Bucharest in 1828 as a member of the Ghica family and was the daughter of Mihai Ghica and the niece of the reigning Prince of Wallachia Grigore IV Ghica. She received a thorough education that was continued abroad – first in Dresden, then in Vienna, then in Venice, and finally in Berlin where she gave a sample of her mastery of Ancient Greek to Alexander von Humboldt.

D'Istria returned to her home country in 1849 and married the Russian duke Alexander Koltsov-Massalski (see also Mosalsk) making her the duchess Helena Koltsova-Massalskaya. They lived for several years in Russia, mostly in Saint Petersburg, but Dora never cherished the Russian nationalist views of her husband or the Eastern Orthodox bigotry of the court of the despotic emperor Nicholas I. As her health decayed in the Russian climate, she took her husband's advice and travelled to Central Europe. She first went to Switzerland for several years and then journeyed through Greece and Anatolia. Finally, she returned to Italy and lived in a villa in Florence, while occasionally traveling to France, Ireland and the United States.

As a writer, she was first noticed in 1855 while she was writing mostly in French under the name d'Istria. She published a number of works that not only showed her proficiency in Romanian, Italian, German, French, Latin, Ancient and Modern Greek, and Russian, but also her knowledge of scientific topics, her liberal views on religious and political topics, as well as a talent for presenting her points. Her general world view was cosmopolitan, but she also worked hard to bring the resources and technologies available in Western Europe to Eastern Europe, and worked towards the emancipation of her gender.

She died in Florence on 17 November 1888.

== In culture ==
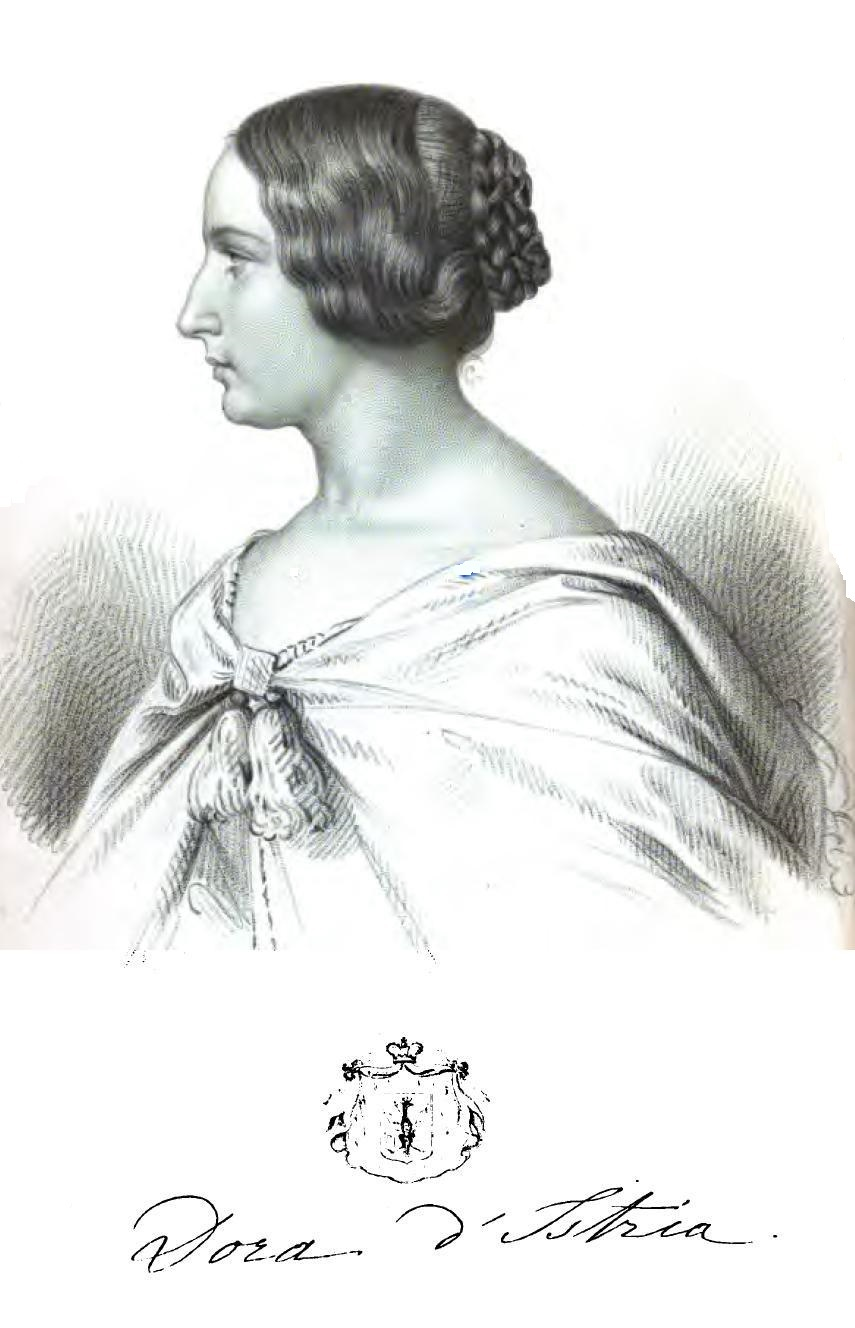
Lithographed portrait of Dora d'Istria

Her first work was La vie monastique dans l'Église orientale ("Monastic Life in the Eastern Church"; Brussels 1855; 2nd ed., Paris 1858), in which she called for the abolishment of monastic orders. It was followed by La Suisse allemande ("German-speaking Switzerland"; Geneva 1856, 4 vols.; German, 2nd ed., Zürich 1860, 3 vols.), a description of Switzerland and its people with a passage describing a climb up the Mönch.

In the tract Les femmes en Orient ("Women in the Orient"; Zürich 1859, 2 vols.) she spoke out for the emancipation of women in the Levant; in Des femmes, par une femme ("About Women, by a Woman"; 2nd ed., Brussels 1869, 2 vols.) she compared the situation of women in Latin Europe with that in Germany and demanded with strong words the equal treatment of men and women. Before this volume, Excursions en Roumélie et en Morée ("Excursions in Rumelia and Morea"; Zürich 1863, 2 vols.) was published, in which she tried to show that 19th-century Germany had the same civilizing task as Ancient Greece..

She also published the narrative Au bord des lacs helvétiques ("Sailing the Swiss Lakes"; Geneva 1861), followed by Les Albanais des deux côtés de l'Adriatique et la nationalité albanaise d'après les chants populaires (lit. 'The Albanians on both sides of the Adriatic and Albanian nationality according to folk songs'; in Revue des deux mondes, 1866, translated into Greek in 1866, Italian and Albanian in 1867) and Gli Albanesi in Rumenia (lit. 'The Albanians in Romania'), a history of her own family, the dukes of Ghica, from the 17th to the 19th century (2nd ed., Florence 1873), and La poésie des Ottomans (lit. 'The poetry of the Ottomans'; 2nd ed., Paris 1877), as well as numerous writings on literary history, poetics, political social and religious questions, history, art and more in renowned journals including the French Revue des Deux Mondes, the Belgian Libre Recherche, and the Italian Diritto, Antologia nuova, Rivista europea and more, as well as various Swiss, Greek, Romanian, and American journals.

D'Istria was also a painter. She was a member of several scholarly societies, such as the Italian academy; she was also named honorary citizen by the Greek parliament and many Italian cities.

She was also a mountaineer, making an early female ascent of Mont Blanc on 1 June 1860. As noted, she wrote a description of her climb of Mönch in La Suisse allemande.

=== The Albanian cause ===
Her family's history and fame, as well as its putative Albanian origins, are mostly known to the Western readers from Princess Elena Ghica's memoirs Gli Albanesi in Rumenia. Storia dei principi Ghika ("The Albanians in Romania. The history of the Ghica Princes").

For Dora d'Istria (Elena Ghica's pen name), the crumbly theory of the Albanian origin of the family's founder, resurrected after several centuries of latent existence, proved to be very lucrative; it gave a new reason for her Romantic involvement in the Balkan people's emancipation struggle (she had previously adopted – and later abandon – a Hellenophile attitude courtesy of her Greek maternal ancestry and the influence of her Greek tutor Gregorios Pappadopoulos), as well as in her anti-establishment attitude generated by the entrenching of the Hohenzollern in the Romanian Principality to the detriment of her family who had high hopes for a return on the throne.

She started learning Albanian history and in 1866 she became the main advocate in Western Europe for the Albanian cause, despite the fact that she never learned the Albanian language.

Her book "Gli Albanesi in Rumenia" was preceded by a series of articles on the nationalities from South-Eastern Europe and their struggle for independence. In the Parisian Revue de deux mondes, where she had published essays on Romanian (1859), Greek (1860) and Serbian (1865) ethnic identities, Dora d'Istria published in 1866 an article entitled La nationalité albanaise d’après les chants populaires, (The Albanian nationality according to folksongs). The study was translated into Albanian in 1867 by the Italo-Albanian patriot Demetrio Camarda, and was prefaced by a revolutionary poem written by an Albanian author and addressed to his countrymen urging Albanians to rise up against the Ottomans.

Henceforth Dora d'Istria became known in Albanians nationalist circles that used her name to gain support for their cause. This situation was mutual and nurtured her writings, and she cultivated relationships with various Albanian patriots, including Demetrio Camarda and Jeronim de Rada. After the publication of Gli Albanesi in Romania... the Albanian nationalists in Italy declared Elena Ghica as the uncrowned queen of Albania.

These speculations were tacitly entertained by Elena Ghica; soon other members of the family were drawn into this Albanian nationalistic tradition. At the end of the century another member of her family, Romanian writer and socialite Albert Ghica, would likewise encourage vocal demands for the Albanian throne. Ghika is an Albanian name, Gjika being the form used today in Albania.

== Sources ==
- Antonio D'Alessandri, Il pensiero e l’opera di Dora d’Istria fra Oriente europeo e Italia (Istituto per la storia del Risorgimento italiano, Biblioteca scientifica, Serie II: Memorie, vol. 54), Roma, Gangemi, 2007
- Meyers Konversations-Lexikon. In turn, it cites as references:
  - Armand Pommier, Madame la comtesse Dora d'Istria (Brussels 1863)
  - Charles Yriarte, Portraits cosmopolites (Paris 1870)
  - Cecchetti, Bartolomeo, Bibliografia della Principessa Elena Gjika, Dora D’Istria (6. Ed., Florence 1873).
- François Buloz, Revue des deux mondes, 1875. Fragment.
