= John Theodore Callimachi =

Prince of Moldavia from 1758 to 1761

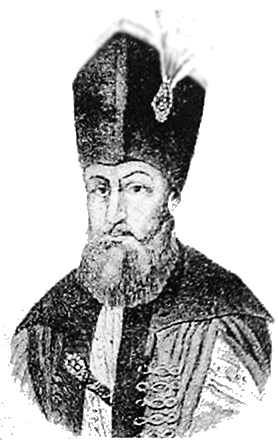

Prince of Moldavia
- Reign: 7 August 1758 – 11 June 1761
- Predecessor: Scarlat Ghica
- Successor: Grigore Callimachi
- Born: 1690; Câmpulung Moldovenesc, Moldavia (now Câmpulung Moldovenesc, Bukovina, Romania)
- Died: 1780 (aged 89–90); Constantinople, Ottoman Empire (now Istanbul, Turkey)
- Spouse: Ralitsa Chrysoskoleos
- Issue: Gregory Callimachi, Alexander Callimachi
- House: Callimachi family
- Father: Teodor Calmăşul
- Religion: Orthodox

John Theodore Callimachi (Romanian: Ioan Teodor Callimachi; 1690–1780) was Prince of Moldavia from 1758 to 1761.

== Early years ==
Ioan was the second son of Teodor Calmăşul. Teodor, born Calmăşul, changed the family name to the Greek form Callimachi (Καλλιμάχης). Ioan's older brother, Gavriil Callimachi (1689–1786) was a monk at Putna Monastery. Ioan pursued his studies at Lvov. He knew Latin, Turkish, Italian, Greek and French.

== Career ==
Callimachi served in the administrations of John Mavrocordatos and of Grigore II Ghica. He was Grand Dragoman at the Ottoman Porte in Istanbul where, over the course of his sixteen years of service, he was recognized for his diplomatic ability. In 1758, he was rewarded with the position of Prince of Moldavia which he held until 1761. Callimachi retired to Constantinople where he lived for 19 years before his death.

== Personal life ==
Callimachi married Ralitsa Chrysoskoleos and they had four children. Their son, Gregory Callimachi (1735–1769), succeeded Callimachi as Prince of Moldavia; and son Alexander Callimachi (1737–1821) was Prince of Moldavia before the turn of the century. Their elder daughter, Sevastiţa (born 1736), married Mihai Suţu; the younger daughter was called Maria (1740–1831).

Preceded by Alexander Ghica	Grand Dragoman of the Porte; 1741–1751	Succeeded by Matei Ghica
Preceded by Matei Ghica	Grand Dragoman of the Porte; 1752–1758	Succeeded by Gregory A. Ghica
Preceded by Scarlat Ghica	Prince of Moldavia; 1758–1761	Succeeded by Gregory Callimachi
