= Grigore IV Ghica =

- Prince of Wallachia
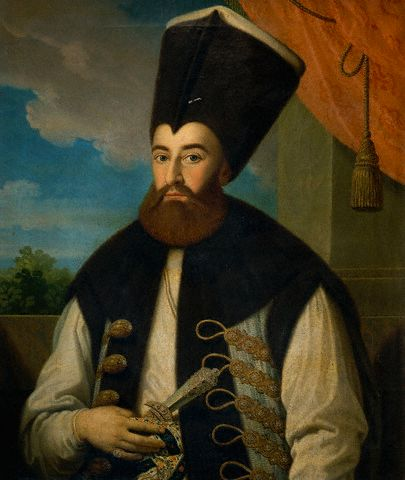
- Oil painting of Prince Grigore IV Ghica

Prince of Wallachia
- Reign: June 30, 1822 – April 29, 1828
- Predecessor: Scarlat Callimachi
- Successor: Alexandru II Ghica
- Born: June 30, 1755; Wallachia
- Died: April 29, 1834 (aged 78); Wallachia
- Spouse: Maria Hangerly; Eufrosina Săvescu
- Issue Detail: Costache Ghica; Iorgu Ghica; Scarlat Ghica; Grigore Ghica; Panait Ghica; Dimitrie Ghica; Maria Ghica; Alexandrina Ghica
Names
- Grigore Dimitrie Ghica
- House: House of Ghica
- Father: Dimitrie Ghica
- Mother: Maria Vacarescu

Grigore IV Ghica or Grigore Dimitrie Ghica (Albanian : Gjika) (June 30, 1755 – April 29, 1834) was Prince of Wallachia between 1822 and 1828. A member of the Albanian Ghica family, Grigore IV was the brother of Alexandru II Ghica and the uncle of Dora d'Istria.

While many of his relatives had occupied the throne in both Wallachia and Moldavia as Phanariotes, the regime change after the Greek War of Independence, Tudor Vladimirescu's 1821 uprising and the Philikí Etaireía's brief rule in the two Danubian Principalities, led to Grigore IV being considered the first in a succession of non-Phanariote rulers. The elections for Prince in the Divan, although prescribed by the Akkerman Convention of 1826, were not to be organized, due mainly to precipitating events. As a Prince, Grigore watched after the development of agriculture in his region. He also assisted in the development of a national Romanian literature.

The Prince was ousted by the Russian occupation (see Russo-Turkish War, 1828–1829).

Grigore IV Ghica was first married to Maria Hangerly or Chantzeres (relative of Ecumenical Patriarch Samuel I Chatzeres), with whom he had six sons (Costache, Iorgu, Scarlat, Grigore, Panait, and Dimitrie), and then to Eufrosina Săvescu, with whom he had two daughters (Maria and Alexandrina).

== Ancestry ==
Ancestors of Grigore IV Ghica

8. Matthaios Ghikas
4. Alexandru Ghika, prince of Valachia and Moldavia
9. countess Roxana Mavrokordataina
2. Dimitrie Ghika, ban of Valachia
10. Demetrios Euphragiotis
5. Helena Euphragiotissa
11.
1. Grigore IV Ghika, prince of Wallachia
12. Ioan Vacarescu, martyr, treasurer of Valachia
6. Barbu Vacarescu, boyar of Tei
13. Stanca Cojescu
3. Maria Vacarescu, heiress of Tei
14. Radul Cantacuzino, chancellor of Valachia
7. Elisabeta Cantacuzina
15. Stanca Brezoianu

Preceded by Scarlat Callimachi	Ruler of Wallachia; 1821–1828	Succeeded by Alexandru II Ghica
