= Alexandros Kallimachis =

Prince of Samos from 1850 to 1876

Prince of Samos
- In office 1850–1854
- Preceded by: Stefan Bogoridi
- Succeeded by: Ion Ghica

Personal details
- Born: c. 1800
- Died: 1876
- Profession: Statesman

Alexandru Callimachi or Alexandros Kallimachis (Greek: Αλέξανδρος Καλλιμάχης), son of Scarlat Callimachi, fled Moldavia with his mother and other members of his family in 1821, at the time of his father's death. The family sought refuge in Russia, where Alexander finished his studies, at the University of Kiev. After traveling through Europe, he made his way to the Ottoman Empire in 1829, where his family possessions and titles were restored to him.

He entered the service of the Ottoman administration, first serving as attache and later as counselor to Rashid Pasha, the Ottoman ambassador to Paris at the time.

In 1848 he was appointed Minister Plenipotentiary to London, and then, a year later, to Paris under the same title. In 1850 he was appointed Prince of Samos, a position which he never accepted personally, choosing rather to administer the island through the offices of a delegate, Georgios Konemenos. Though his rule was resisted by some of the islanders, he is known for having founded the constitutional political system of the Principality. That consisted of the separation of the divided the legislative, executive and judicial powers. He also advanced the educational system, establishing four Greek schools and twenty two elementary schools, and also established a system of courts as well as a printing house.

In 1853 he retired to Versailles but was recalled in 1855 was appointed ambassador to Vienna, a position which he was only able to assume after having played an important part in the Istanbul conferences on the re-organization of the Danubian principalities.

For his services, in June 1861, Kallimachis was granted the Ottoman title of Bala, the first Christian to have been conferred that honor.

== Sources ==
- Nita Dan Danielescu. "Gavriil Callimachi, ctitorul Catedralei mitropolitane Sf. Gheorghe din Iasi" Ziarul Lumina, 2006-02-20
- Thompson Cooper. Men of the Time: A Dictionary of Contemporaries. p. 201; G. Routledge and sons, London, New York, 1875
- The History of Samos
