= Alexander Hangerli =

Prince of Moldavia in 1807

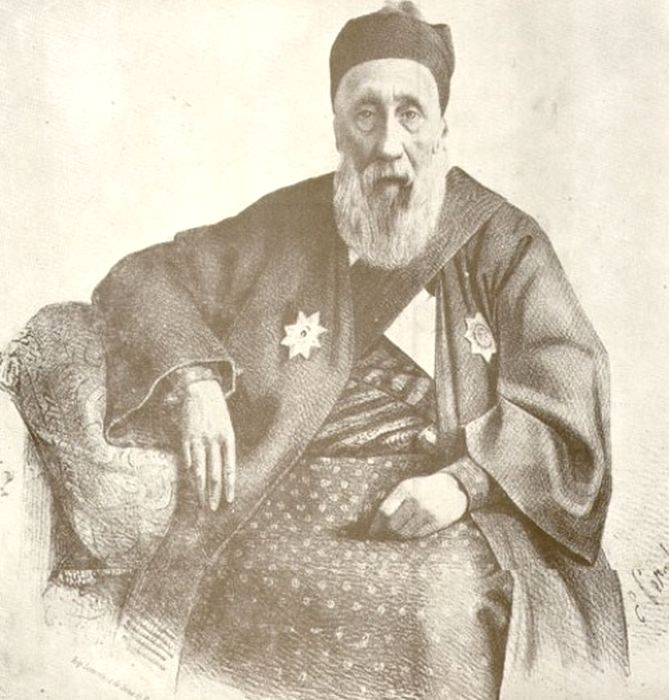
- Hangerli in 1850

Prince of Moldavia
- Reign: 7 March – 24 July 1807
- Predecessor: Alexander Mourouzis
- Successor: Scarlat Callimachi
- Born: 1768; Istanbul
- Died: 12 June 1854 (aged 85–86); Moscow
- Religion: Orthodox

Alexander Hangerli or Handjeri (Greek: Αλέξανδρος Χαντζερής, French: Alexandre Handjeri, Romanian: Alexandru Hangerli or Hangerliu, Russian: Александр Ханжерли, Aleksandr Hanzherli, Александр Хангерли, Aleksandr Hangerli or Александру Хангерли, Aleksandru Hangerli; 1768 – 12 June 1854) was a Dragoman of the Porte of the Ottoman Empire, and Prince of Moldavia between March 7 and July 24, 1807. He spent the latter part of his life as a refugee in the Russian Empire, where he became noted as a linguist. He was the brother of Constantine Hangerli, who reigned as Prince of Wallachia before being executed in 1799.

== Life ==
Born in Constantinople, Hangerli received a thorough education, was trained to speak several European languages, as well as Ottoman Turkish and Arabic, and prepared for a high-ranking position in the Danubian Principalities. In his twenties, he married a princess of the Callimachi family.

Although coming into conflict with Ottoman officials on several occasions, Hangerli was advanced to the position of Dragoman of the Porte in 1805, and maintained the office for the following two years, until Sultan Selim III appointed him Prince of Moldavia in place of the deposed Alexander Mourousis. He was nevertheless prevented from reaching his court in Iaşi by the Russian occupation of the country, and instead followed the Ottoman Army in their offensive (see Russo-Turkish War (1806–1812)). He was able to gain his throne after the Treaty of Bucharest, and played a major part in reestablishing the country's administration.

Hangerli was ultimately deposed from his throne and replaced by Scarlat Callimachi. Sources diverge in respect to the reason for this measure: according to the 1858 Nouvelle biographie générale, feeling insecure of his position as opposition to Sultan Selim mounted throughout the Empire, he had asked for his own deposition; a French traveler to the region, Captain Aubert, recorded that pressures had been made on him by the Porte to provide it with more income, and he had been ousted after not being able to fulfill the requirements.

Upon the outbreak of the Greek War of Independence, Hangerli felt threatened by a possible Ottoman move against the Phanariotes. He was allegedly warned by the Russian ambassador to the Porte, Alexander Grigoriyevich Stroganov, that, as a prominent Greek in Istanbul, he risked being assassinated, and decided to flee the country. Hangerli and his family (including his two sons, Gregory and Telemach), embarked on a small ship and took sail across the Black Sea, taking harbor in Odessa (where they were given asylum by Novorossiya's governor, Alexandre Langeron).

Alexander Hangerli soon moved to Moscow, where he was received with honors by Emperor Alexander I. His title was recognized by Russian nobility, and his two sons were appointed Counsellors.

In 1840–1842, he published a three-volume dictionary of French, Arabic, Persian, and Ottoman Turkish words, which was printed by the Russian state; in full, it was titled Dictionnaire français-arabe, persan et turc, enrichi d'exemples en langue turque, avec des variantes, et beaucoup de mots d'arts et de sciences. In recognition of this work, he was awarded the Order of St. Anna. According to the Nouvelle biographie générale, he had begun work on the volumes as early as 1806, upon the request of Armand Charles Guilleminot, future Ambassador to the Porte. Hangerli retired from public life after that date, and dedicated himself to the education of his grandson, Michel Ulangali (a literary critic, the latter settled in France).

One of his grandsons, Prince Nicolaus Handjery, was an important politician in the German Empire.

Vacant Russian occupation Title last held by Alexandru Moruzi	Prince of Moldavia; 1807	Succeeded by Scarlat Callimachi
