= Gavriil Callimachi =

Gavriil Callimachi (Romanian pronunciation: [ɡaˈvriːl kaliˈmaci]; 1689–1786) was a monk at Putna Monastery who rose eventually to the position of Metropolitan of Moldavia. He was born Gheorghe Călmaşul, son of the Câmpulung headman, Teodor Călmaşul, and younger brother of Ioan Teodor Callimachi, Prince of Moldavia from 1758 to 1761.

Gheorghe Callimachi took monks' orders at the Putna Monastery, receiving the name of Gavriil. With the aid of his brother, he is appointed archdeacon of the Ecumenical Patriarchy of Constantinople, then Metropolitan of Salonica, finally reaching the position of Metropolitan of Moldavia, position to which he is appointed by his brother upon the latter's rise to the position of ruler.

Gavriil founded the Sf. George Cathedral in Iaşi, where he was later buried, on February 20, 1786.

== Sources ==
- Nita Dan Danielescu. "Gavriil Callimachi, ctitorul Catedralei mitropolitane Sf. Gheorghe din Iasi" Ziarul Lumina, 2006-02-20
- Ghyka family website, genealogical tree
