= Hospodar =

Slavic title meaning "Lord"

Gospodar or hospodar, also gospodin as a diminutive, is a term of Slavic origin, meaning "lord" or "master". The compound (Belarusian: гаспадар, Bulgarian: господар, Macedonian: господар, Serbo-Croatian: gospodar, господар, Ukrainian: господар) is a derivative of gospod / gospodin, transl. (L)ord / gentleman or Sir, or when spelled with a capital G (Gospod / Gospodin) it translates as Lord for God.

== Etymology ==
The etymology of the word can be traced back to the connotation of the Indo-European patron-client and guest-host relationship.

=== Patron-client ===
Rich patrons sponsored feasts as a way for them to promote and secure a political hierarchy built on the unequal mobilization of labor and resources, by displaying their generosity towards the rest of the community. Rivals competed publicly through the size and complexity of their feasts, and alliances were confirmed by gift-giving and promises made during those public gatherings. The host of the feast was called the *ghosti-potis, the 'lord of the guests', who honored the immortal gods and his mortal guests with gifts of food, drink, and poetry.

=== Guest-host ===
In Proto-Indo-European, the term *ghós-ti-, whose original meaning must have been "table companion", could either mean a host or a guest. The connotation of an obligatory reciprocity between both guests and hosts has persisted in descendant cognates, such as Latin hospēs ("foreigner, guest; host"), Old English ġiest ("stranger, guest"), or Old Church Slavonic gostĭ ("guest") and gospodĭ ("master").

The *potis compound is rare as a Slavic lexeme. It might have arisen as an additional calque of the Greek 'despótēs' (-πότης), yet the presence of *potis in Iranic languages e.g Avestani dəng paitiš “master of the house”, might indicate an older and universal usage of the compound. The word *batь (attested in Bulgarian and Ukrainian and meaning bigger brother and later additionally transforming into 'bashta' or father in Bulgarian) is shared among Uralic, Turkic and Iranic languages, with the p- > b- transformation likely indicating a transition through a Turkic language of an originally Indo-European word. Another view is that it is a baby-talk modification of *bratrъ (“brother”), since it morphologically resembles kin terms ending in *-tь, including *zętь (“son-in-law”), *tьstь (“father-in-law”), *netь(jь) (“nephew”). The Proto-Slavic word *pǫdurъ (“watchman, guard”) is also notable in its relation to the word and is a later loanword in Hungarian.

== Gospodar v. hospodar ==
The pronunciation "hospodar" (i.e. with a fricative) of a word written as "господар" in some Slavic languages, which retains the Cyrillic script, could be due to the influence of either Ukrainian, where the first letter is pronounced as [ɦ], or that of Belarusian and Church Slavonic, where it is pronounced as [ɣ].

== Slavic usage ==
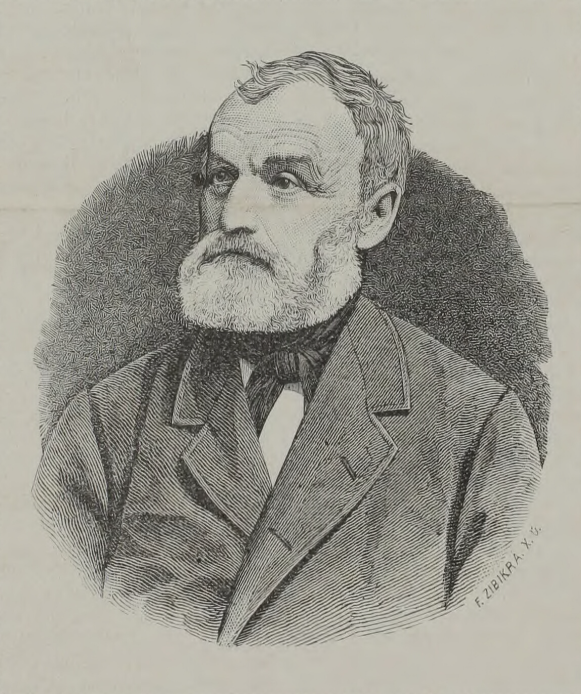
Dominik Špatinka, hospodar of Moravia

In the Slavic language family, compound "gospodar" / "hospodar" is usually applied to the master/owner of a house/household or other property and also the head of a family or clan. In some languages the hospodars house or household is called "hospóda", however, in other, such as in South Slavic, "(g)ospoda" translates as "gentry" as just a plural derived from "gospodin" and/or "gospodar". There is also an alternative form for the head of the household, "gazda", "gazdarica" as a feminine, and "gazdinstvo" as a household and/or property. "Gazda" form is also common in Hungary.

In Slovene, Macedonian, Serbo-Croatian and Bulgarian, "gospodar" (господар) means a "master", "lord", or "sovereign lord". Other derivatives of the word include "gospodarstvo", which means ownership, household and property, and economy, gospodin (господин), which translates as "Sir", "gentleman" and/or "Mister" (in Bulgarian, Russian, Macedonian, and Serbo-Croatian), and "gospodstvo" (in Serbo-Croatian). Meanwhile, "Gospod" and "Gospodin" refers to God and is identical to Russian gospod` (господь, "the Lord") and gosudar' ("sovereign").

In Slovene gospod ("Mister", "gentleman"), the Polish gospodarz ("host", "owner", "presenter") usually used to describe a peasant/farmer (formal name for a peasant/farmer is "rolnik," and common is "chłop" which also means "guy"), and the Czech hospodář (archaic term for "master"). All forms stem from the Proto-Slavic word gospodŭ (господъ). In Slovak and Czech, the word Hospodin (capitalized) is an older and rare address of God. Related to it is hospodár, in a stricter sense an owner or manager of a farm or similar establishment (poľnohospodárstvo) or agriculture is composed of "field" and hospodár. In a broader sense, a manager of any resource. The verb hospodáriť is translated as "to manage", esp. money and property. In Czech, the word Hospodin (capitalized) is another address to God. Related to it is hospodář referring to a person, that manages some property (e.g. steward, major-domo, bailiff, manciple or bursar), especially in agriculture (e.g. husbandman, farmer, landowner).

=== Medieval usage examples ===
The title was used briefly towards the end of the Second Bulgarian Empire. In 1394–95, Ivan Shishman of Bulgaria referred to himself not as a Tsar (as traditionally), but as a gospodin of Tarnovo, and in foreign sources was styled herzog or merely called an "infidel bey". This was possibly to indicate vassalage to Bayezid I or the yielding of the imperial title to Ivan Sratsimir.

In Bosnia and Serbia all male persons of noble status were referred to as gospodin regardless of their hereditary title, even monarchs.

After his conquest of the Principality of Galicia, Casimir III was styled "Gospodar of the Rusian Land" in the Ruthenian language. When the region was ceded to the Grand Duchy of Lithuania, "gospodar" subsequently became a title of the Grand Dukes of Lithuania. In that sense it is also used in official documents (e.g. the granting of privileges to the Kiev Voivodeship), as Chancery Slavonic was an official language in the eastern parts of the Grand Duchy. The Ruthenian-language Book of Inscriptions No. 8 in the Lithuanian Metrica also attests to the regular use of the style "hospodar" by subjects when addressing the Grand Duke of Lithuania.

=== In popular culture ===
As a term denoting authority the word gospodar has also been the subject of ironic derision. A good example is the song "Gospodar" from the early 1980s by the Slovene punk rock band Pankrti.

== Non-Slavic usage ==
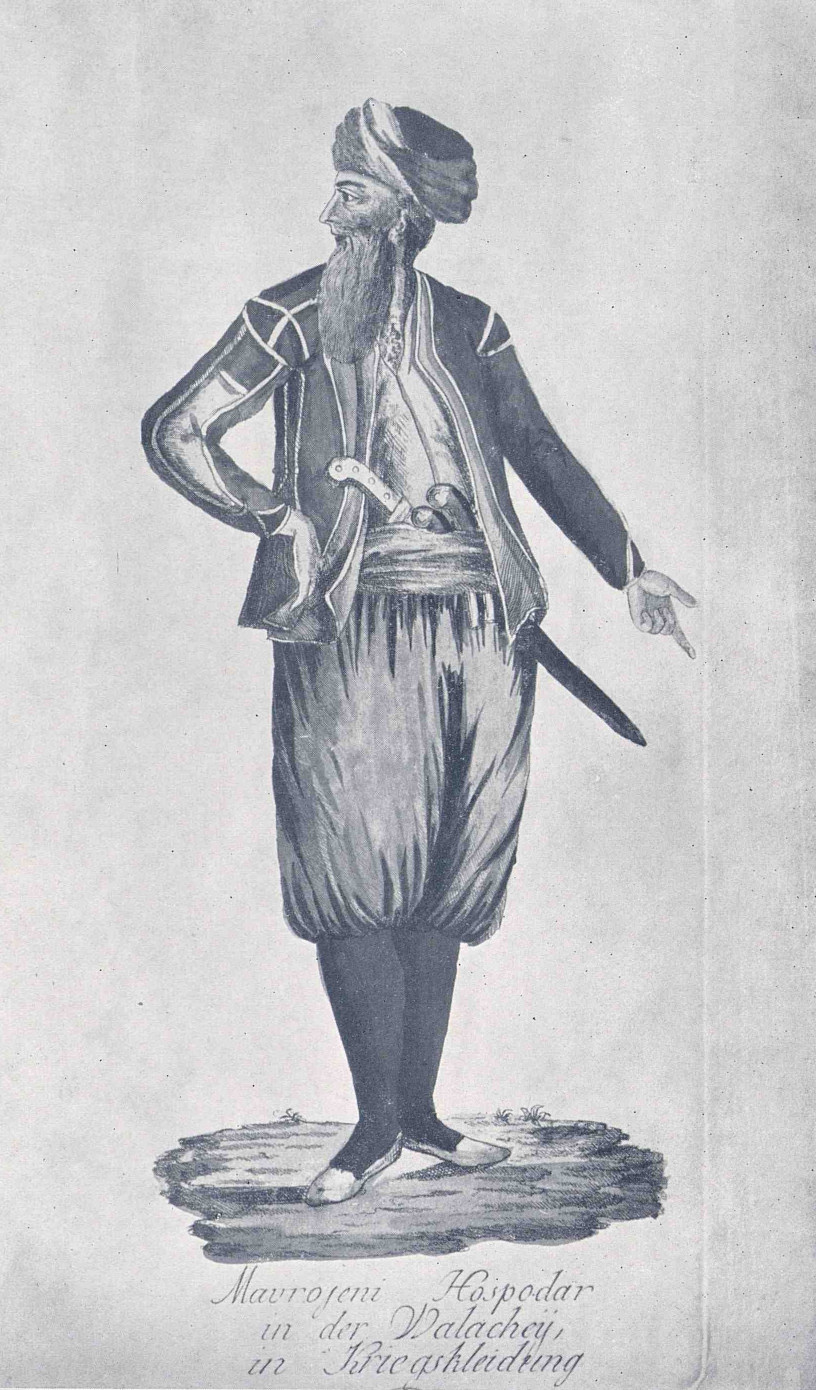
Nicholas Mavrogheni, hospodar of Wallachia

The rulers of Wallachia and Moldavia were styled hospodars in Slavic writings from the 14th century to 1866; the English equivalent of this title is Lord (with the meaning of autonomous ruler). Hospodar was used in addition to the title voivod. When writing in Romanian, the term Domn (from the Latin dominus) was used. At the end of this period, as the title had been held by many vassals of the Ottoman Sultan, its retention was considered inconsistent with the independence of the United Principalities (formalized from Romania only in 1878 — replacing the tributary status).

The term made its way into the Romanian language after many centuries, but under a different meaning gospodar (female: gospodină) means a manager of a household or a property (gospodărie).

Hungarian word gazda = "potentate", "rich landowner" is borrowed from the language of Southern Slavs who inhabited today's Hungary before the arrival of the Hungarians, aka Magyars, to Europe.

== See also ==
- Domn
- Phanariots
- Slavic honorifics
- Slavic titles
- Voivode
