= Paharnic =

Romanian rank

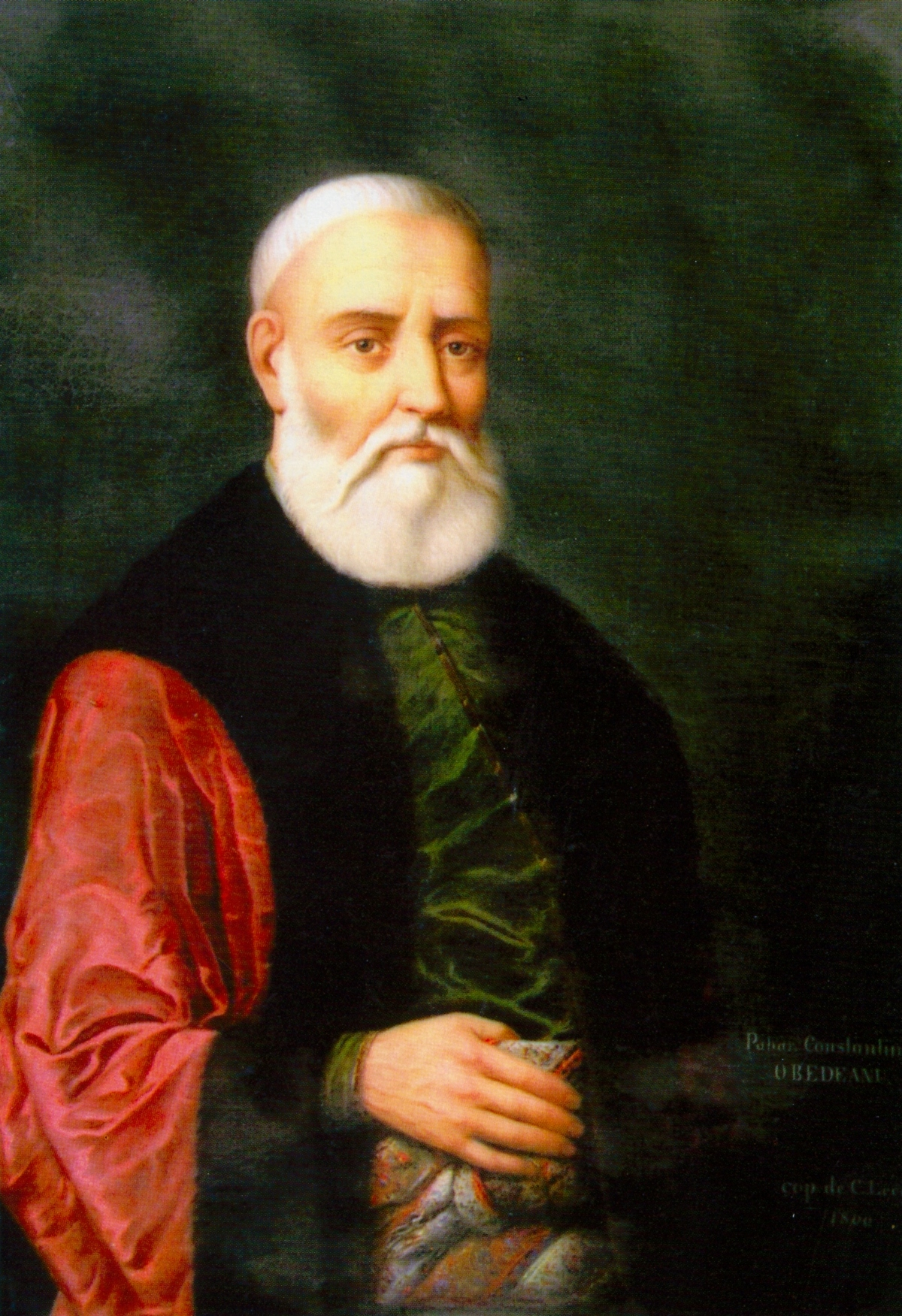
The 1750s Paharnic Constantin Obedeanu of Craiova. From an 1860 copy by Constantin Lecca, who was himself a Paharnic

The Paharnic (plural: Paharnici; also known as Păharnic, Paharnec, or Păharnec; Moldavian dialect: ceașnic, Greek: παχάρνικος, pakharnikos, Russian: пахарник, paharnik) was a historical Romanian rank, one of the non-hereditary positions ascribed to the boyar aristocracy in Moldavia and Wallachia (the Danubian Principalities). It was the local equivalent of a cup-bearer or cześnik, originally centered on pouring and obtaining wine for the court of Moldavian and Wallachian Princes. With time, it became a major administrative office and, in Wallachia, also had a lesser military function. The retinue of such boyars, usually called Păhărnicei, was in both countries also a private army.

Dating back to c. 1400, the Paharnici were at the forefront of political life in Wallachia over the following two centuries, often as a title associated with the Craiovești and Florescu boyars. Wallachian Paharnici were especially important during the 16th and 17th centuries, when they included figures such as Lupu Mehedințeanu, Șerban of Coiani, and Matei Basarab. They and other Paharnici established means of boyar protection against the social ascent of immigrant Greeks. Prince Constantin Brâncoveanu, himself a former Paharnic, gave a privileged position to the Păhărnicei, but put to death their controversial Paharnic, Staico Bucșanu. Before 1700, figures associated with the Moldavian office included close relatives of the monarchs, such as Alexandru Coci and Ștefan Lupașcu Hâjdău. Though the office itself steadily declined in importance, it was still subjected to a meritocratic reform by Prince Dimitrie Cantemir.

The Paharnici grew in numbers and declined in political relevancy from ca. 1720, with the rise of the Phanariotes, and ultimately fell into a second class of boyars. Their descendants were recognized as a branch of the small boyardom, alongside the Păhărnicei. While these became a rural middle class, the Paharnici offices were increasingly permeable to the commercial classes of the city. The three groups intertwined, with some Paharnici, including Ianache Hafta and Manuc Bei, having a noted effect on the development of Bucharest. Various Paharnici also participated first-hand in the cultivation of Romanian nationalism, leading up to Gavril Istrati's clashes with the Greek "Sacred Band".

From Moldavia, the office was for a while inherited by the Russian Empire, which preserved titular Paharnici in its Bessarabia Governorate. In both Moldavia and Wallachia, the Russian regime of 1834–1854 recognized a multitude of titular Paharnici, from inspectors Ion Heliade Rădulescu and Constantin N. Brăiloiu to painter Constantin Lecca. The proliferation of Paharnici and other offices, taken up by Moldavian Princes Ioan and Mihail Sturdza, contributed to social tensions, and then to a failed revolutionary attempt. Following the Crimean War, the position of Paharnic was abolished, alongside all other historical titles.

== Name ==
Paharnic is a Romanianized term, originating with the Church Slavonic variant, Пєхарник (Peharnik). Dimitrie Cantemir, the intellectual Prince of Moldavia, was the first to note that the institution was copied from the old Serbian nomenclature, as opposed to other boyar titles, which were originally Byzantine or (in one case) Hungarian. However, legal historian Ivan Biliarsky notes that both the Serbian and the Romanian term originate with a Byzantine office, the Pinkernes, being its functional equivalents. The component Romanian term is pahar ("glass" or "chalice"), which reached Romanian either from the Hungarian pohár or the Serbo-Croatian pehar. After passing through Slavonic, Paharnic acquired a form in historical Romanian, and Romanian Cyrillic, as Пъхарникȣ, transliterated Păharnic ([pəˈharnic], rather than [paˈharnic]). It was still codified in this manner by the early-18th-century scholar Anthim the Iberian.

All these terms continued to be spelled in Cyrillic for as long as the titles they represented were in use. However, attempts at Romanization were made as early as 1468, when Paharnic appeared as Poharnig in a Renaissance Latin document; this was also rendered as Paharnig. In the 1670s, Miron Costin, using standardized Polish spellings, produced Paharnik. Before 1600, Slavonic documents also admitted a Romanian translation, Canatnic, created from the dialectal canată, "tiny mug". Ceașnic was another Slavonic variant which acquired use in Moldavia, where it was generally spelled as Чашникь; it could also appear in Wallachia, but as Чашникȣ. Both have their etymological source in Cześnik, used by szlachta nobility to the north. A synonymous term originating from the Second Bulgarian Empire, Пичерникȣ (Picernic), only appears once, in 1392 Wallachia.

== History ==
=== Creating the office ===
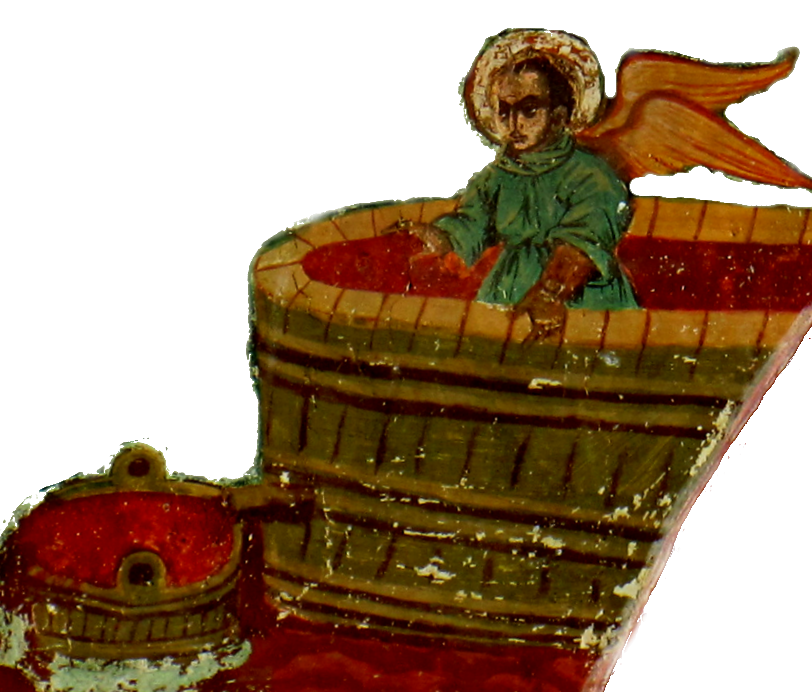
Wine press in Moldavia, ca. 1600. Fresco from Sucevița Monastery, illustrating the Book of Revelation as well as the Book of Isaiah

Paharnici or similar were first mentioned in Wallachia under Mircea the Old (1386–1418) and in Moldavia under Alexander the Good (1400–1432). The Moldavian version of the office ranked it immediately after the Spatharios; in Wallachia, it was originally mentioned as below the Vistier, who was fourth or fifth in line in the Boyar Council (Romanian: Sfatul boieresc) the Ban, Vornic, Logothete, and sometimes also the Spatharios, ranked above them. A social and functional differentiation cut across these boyar classes. According to such typologies, some boyar offices were administrative or "public" (Ban or Logothete), while others, including Ban and Spatharios, were purely military. Paharnici fell into a third category of offices, deemed "courtly" (de curte)—alongside Cluceri, Jitniceri, Medelniceri, Pitari, Postelnici, Slugeri, and Stolnici.

As summarized by historian Constantin Rezachevici, a Paharnic's function was "to fill up the first cup at the prince's table, and while in the country he supervised the princely vineyards and made sure that these were well kept". Biliarsky also notes that the Paharnic acted as a waiter and a wine taster, who made sure that the beverage was safe to drink, being thus "close to and very highly trusted by the ruler." From the beginning, these attributes alternated with the business of state: in October 1407, Paharnic Iliaș "Dumitrovscio" was present on the Moldavian delegation which swore fealty to the Kingdom of Poland, and consequently fought at Grunwald. A variation of the office, already present in 1540s Moldavia, was the Paharnic in service to the Princess-consort.

Also in Moldavia, Paharnici had direct control over the Staroste of Cotnari, who produced the eponymous sweet wine variety, seen as the region's best, as well as over the wine regions of Dealu Morii, Hârlău, Huși, and Târgu Trotuș. After 1482, the Moldavian institution also appeared in the wine-rich Panciu, Putna County, which had been previously disputed between the two principalities. By 1700, the greater Paharnic was, ex officio, the head of Putna's administration, while his assistant only controlled the princely vineyards of Huși. Historian N. Stoicescu proposes that the Wallachian Paharnici may have also exercised some control over the winemakers of Dealurile Buzăului. This function remains unattested, but is suggested by the Paharnici being traditionally reliant on support from that area, on the Wallachian border with Putna.

In tandem, Paharnici in both principalities operated as tax farmers, receiving a small contribution from all other winemakers. This was presented to them personally on September 14 of each year. Moldavia's Paharnic collected only the wine tithe known as vinărici. For the Wallachians, the vinărici was set at 1,000 barrels of wine yearly, from the wineries of Argeș County (Ștefănești, Topoloveni) and Vâlcea County (Drăgășani). Here, another special tribute, also collected from private wine cellars, was generally known as păhărnicie, and was primarily lucrative in Bucharest. 18th-century sources inform that the Paharnic of Wallachia also collected the wine tax known as cămănărit, which had its origins in feudal aid (plocon).

=== Early feudal revolts ===
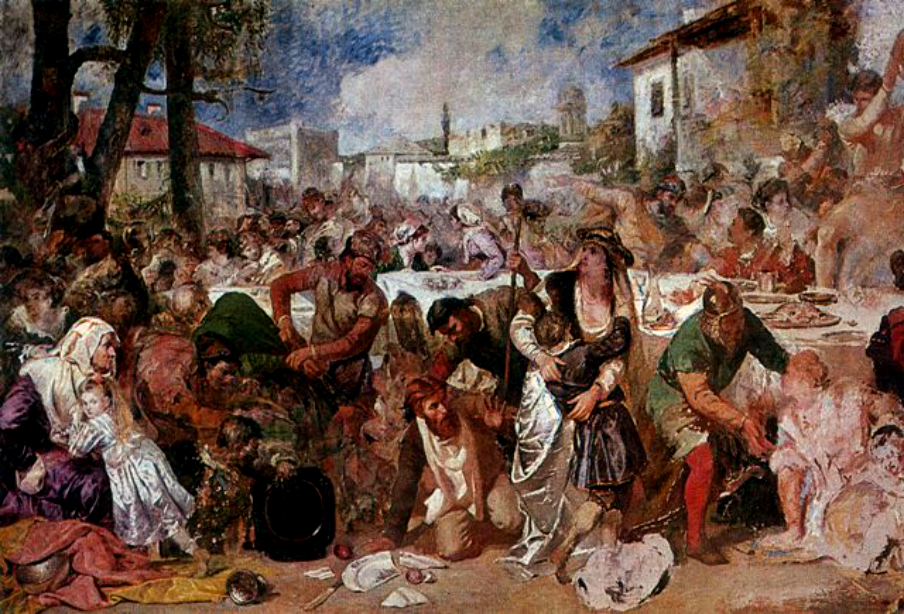
Vlad the Impaler's envoys capturing the boyars during a feast (April 1457), in an 1860s painting by Theodor Aman

The Paharnici were assisted by their own private army, the Păhărnicei ("little Paharnici", singular Păhărnicel). At least originally, these were junior members of the aristocracy: the first known Moldavian Păhărnicel, mentioned as such in December 1437, was a Pan Ureche. He had earlier been Iliaș I's Paharnic, and went on to become his Vornic in 1438. At some point in or after 1479, Stephen the Great rewarded another Păhărnicel, Cârstea, with the deeds to Coșești village. Also in Moldavia, Paharnici were the only ones mandated to pass judgment in cases involving their retinue. Other records show that they (assisted by the relevant Pârcălabi) passed judgment in all cases directly involving wine, either at Cotnari or Hârlău. The Paharnici were nevertheless entirely subject to the Prince's expedient justice, as already shown in the 1480s, when Stephen the Great ordered the execution of his Paharnic Negrilă, for reasons unrecorded.

During the Wallachian 15th century, the titles of Paharnic and Ban were closely associated with a family known as Craiovești. Its founder, Barbu I, emerged ca. 1431 as Paharnic of Alexander I Aldea, sitting on the Boyar Council, but was probably chased out of the country by Vlad II Dracul. This period highlighted the civil war between the houses of Dănești, to whom the Craiovești were loyal, and the family of Vlad II, or Drăculești. A differentiation of boyar offices first occurred in Wallachia under Dănești rulers. Vladislav II (1447–1456) created the Craiovești family as his Vlastelini, presumably meaning "strong" or "immovable boyars". That category included the Paharnic alongside the Ban, Vornic, Logothete and other lesser dignities. Most of these functions (20/34) went to boyars who were also family with the Prince, descending from the earlier House of Basarab.

Later in the 1450s, Vlad the Impaler staged a boyar purge, reportedly killing all of his Council who identified the Dănești as actual Princes. In 1482, Basarab Țepeluș, who also relegated the Craiovești, raised his Paharnic Mircea to a second position in the Council ranks. The first Craiovești Prince, Neagoe Basarab (reigned 1512–1521), assigned the office of Paharnic to a more distant relative, Drăghici Florescu, to whom he also gave ownership of Tismana. The Teachings, a political treatise often attributed to Neagoe, go further in proposing that the office of Paharnic be assigned to foreign mercenaries, thus ensuring meritocracy. Historian P. P. Panaitescu notes that this detail, as well as the designation of Paharnici as Credinciari, establishes that the book is a forgery.

The Wallachian Paharnic was also a rank in the feudal levy army, commanding the Păhărnicei as a mounted corps. The latter, alongside lesser boyars in service to the Paharnici, formed a special military corps and fiscal category, separate from the retinues of other boyar ranks. There were probably 13 such "orders" in 1580s Moldavia, where the Păhărnicei themselves were still relevant landowners. Before 1600, a Păhărnicel Ionașcu owned the entire village of Drăgușeni, which his family later sold to Prince Miron Barnovschi. Nevertheless, the office of Paharnic in itself did not guarantee financial independence. In 1557, under Wallachia's Pătrașcu the Good, Paharnic Vlad of Bârsești became financially destitute and, as one record shows, even faced starvation.

=== Michael the Brave's boyars ===
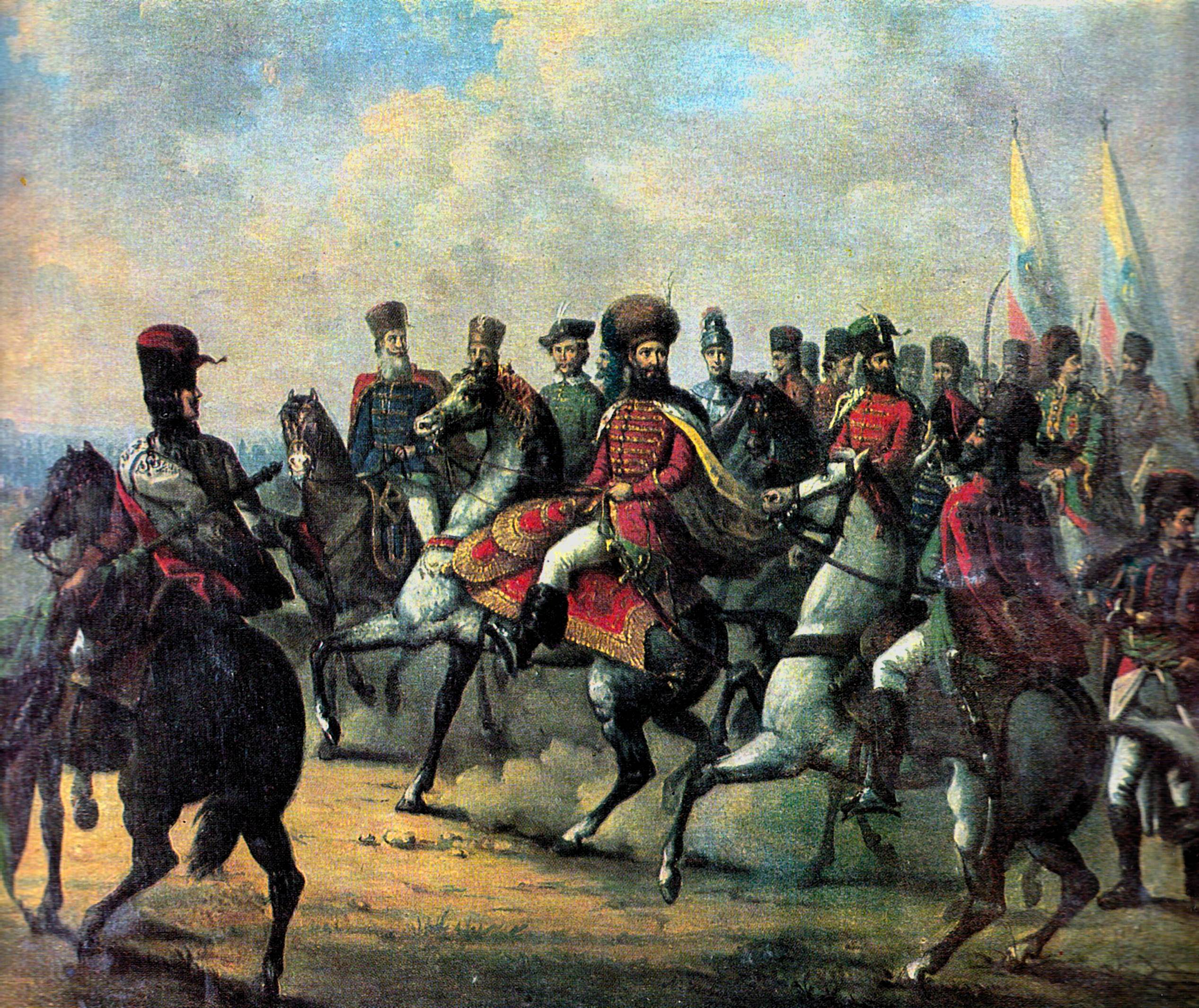
Michael the Brave and his military commanders, as depicted in 1857 by Nicolae Grigorescu

With the delegation of military power came the Paharnic's involvement in more rebellions. This also coincided with the increase of power for the Ottoman Empire, which was Wallachia and Moldavia's suzerain power throughout the Late Medieval and Early Modern eras. In the early 1540s, a holder of the title, Stroe Florescu, followed Șerban of Izvorani and fought against Wallachian Prince Radu Paisie; both rebels were executed. At around the same time, Moldavia's Petru Rareș was facing boyar rebellions in Cârligătura County, confiscating a village from Paharnic Ștefan Mânjea and donating another to the loyalist replacement, Nicoară. The 1570s witnessed one of several wars between the two principalities, with Moldavia's John III occupying Bucharest, allowing Radu Paisie's putative grandson, Vintilă, to take over as Prince of Wallachia. This days-long reign was probably ended by the supporters of Alexandru Mircea, including a Paharnic Bratu. In the early 1580s, one of Vintilă's surviving brothers, Prince Petru Cercel, ordered the execution of another rebellious Paharnic, Gonțea.

In 1595, Vintilă and Cercel's alleged brother, Michael the Brave, took up the anti-Ottoman cause in the Long Turkish War. Shortly after, he punished his Paharnic Iane of Boleasca, taking over Iane's estate at Daia. This was possibly a payback for cowardice shown in the battle of Călugăreni. Instead, Michael's other Paharnici were held in high esteem for their service, and received villages from Michael's personal land fund: Lupu Mehedințeanu took the villages of Dobra and Ponorălul; Paharnic Turturea was awarded Găuriciu. A mercenary commander, known as Necula Paharnic, was also awarded the village of Roșiani, in Romanați County.

Among the holders of the Paharnic title since the days of Mihnea Turcitul was a matrilineal Craiovești, Radu Șerban (Șerban of Coiani), who successfully litigated over his family's assets. Șerban continued to serve under Michael the Brave and his son Nicolae Pătrașcu, selling his estates at Seaca de Pădure and Segarcea to the former. In 1600, having already conquered the Principality of Transylvania, Michael also extended his rule into Moldavia. The uprooted Movilești regime of Moldavia continued to exist in exile, receiving crucial backing from the loyalist Paharnic and diplomat, Ion Caraiman. The following year, during the troubles that followed Michael's downfall, Șerban of Coiani was elected Wallachian Prince by the boyar assembly at Sălătrucu, taking the new name of Radu Șerban.

This new ruler extended his protection to Michael's other associates. Turturea was present by Michael's side at Câmpia Turzii, where Michael was assassinated. He rescued his lord's severed head and kept it as a relic. Radu Șerban's court also included Mehedințeanu as a Paharnic, until 1611, when he defected to the Ottoman-appointed Prince, Radu Mihnea. The office of Paharnic was also a major station in the career of Matei Basarab, a junior Craiovești boyar; in 1612, Matei began using a personal seal that showed the Paharnic seated on a throne and carrying his special cane. Radu Șerban's regime, allied with the Holy Roman Empire, was finally ended by the Ottomans. The deposed Prince tried to return by way of Moldavia, supported by the local Prince, Alexandru Movilă. However, Costea Bucioc, the Moldavian Paharnic, ended this campaign by refusing to fight.

Mehedințeanu, who continued to serve as Paharnic, found himself at odds with the new establishment and especially the Greek immigrants, fleeing the country during the reign of Alexandru IV Iliaș (1616–1618). He returned as leader of a popular revolt, taking control of both Bucharest and Târgoviște, where he inspired an anti-Greek pogrom. Appointed Prince by the Ottomans, Gabriel Movilă handed Mehedințeanu over to Iskender Pasha, who ordered the Paharic impaled at Ciocănești. A decade later, under Leon Tomșa, the office of Paharnic was held by a Greek, Balasache Muselim, whose tenure sparked another revolt, which peaked at Bucharest and had Matei Basarab among its leaders. The movement was weakened when Prince Leon appointed locals to the higher offices, making Barbu Brădescu his new Paharnic. Brădescu switched sides in 1632, helping to seize Wallachia's throne for Matei.

In ca. 1655, the Paharnic's private army was largely amassed on the border with Moldavia: in Buzău and Râmnicu Sărat Counties there were 300–400 Păhărnicei. These were commanded by a captain, 6 Iuzbași, and 6 Ceauși. By that moment in history, Paharnici had declined in relative importance. This was manifest under Matei Basarab, who ordered his new Paharnic, Chisar Rudeanu, to be caned in the throne room, then jailed. Under his regime, the Păhărnicei and other servants of the Paharnic owed a yearly tax of 8 ducats, while boyars subordinated to the Spatharios paid 12. Both countries' Paharnici were soon outranked by the Stolnici and Comiși; in Wallachia, however, they continued to command the Păhărnicei, and were also placed in charge of a new cavalry force, the Roșii ("Redcoats"). Both groups fought alongside the Ottoman Army in the Polish war of 1672.

=== Cantacuzino era ===
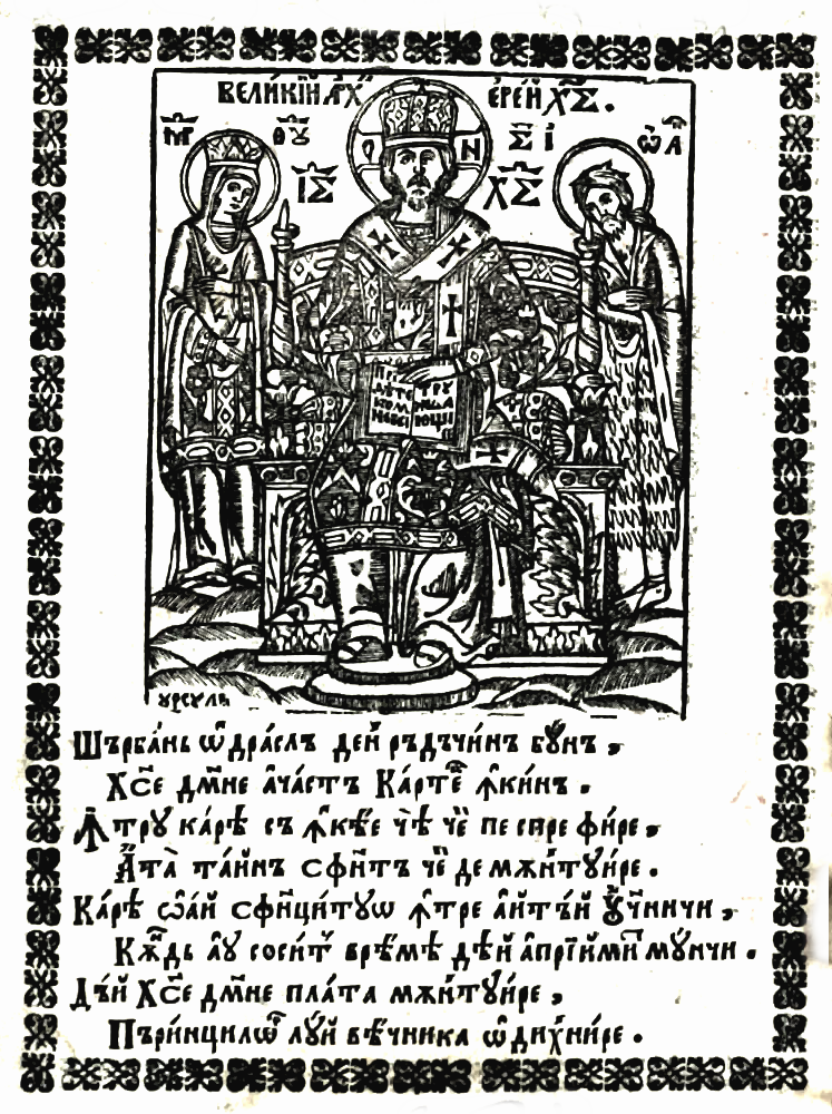
Ex-voto of the Paharnic Șerban II Cantacuzino, describing him as stemming "from a fine root"—the Cantacuzino family. From a 1702 print of the Gospel, with engraving of Christ the King

Rosetti family arms, displaying the silver cup (in reference to Constantin Rosetti's service at the Moldavian court) and three canting roses

After 1650, some Wallachian Paharnici opposed the steady rise of the Cantacuzino family, whose scion Drăghici Cantacuzino also held the title in 1661–1662, while others embraced it. Among the anti-Cantacuzino boyars, 1660s Paharnic Constantin Vărzarul plotted, alongside Stroe Leurdeanu, to have Constantin I Cantacuzino unlawfully executed. Another such conflict erupted in the early 1680s between Prince Șerban Cantacuzino and his Paharnic, Papa Buicescul (son of the Spatharios Diicul). Under the Cantacuzinos, the lesser Paharnici were all placed under the command of the greater Paharnic, who organized them into a single military unit. By then, the armed retinues, and those of all other high-ranking boyars, were collectively known as Feciori ("Young Men" or "Boys") or Slugi ("Servants"). With the peak of serfdom in both countries, these Feciori were exclusively recruited from among free or manumitted peasants. According to historian Constantin Giurescu, the Wallachian Păhărnicei, as a special set of Feciori, might have been supporting themselves from păhărnicie revenues, which they collected for their patron. This practice is attested in Moldavia, where, following the drought of September 1663, Princess Ecaterina Dabija warned Feciori not to collect the tithe from Armenians and Jews, as this would have exhausted the supply.

A Cantacuzino ally, Constantin Brâncoveanu, took the throne in 1688, replacing Șerban. He himself had for long been a regular boyar, first serving as a Paharnic when he was aged 17. During his subsequent reign, the Păhărnicei appear to have been almost exclusively confined to Râmnicu Sărat County, with some also present in Mehedinți County. Scholar Alexandru Ligor notes that, "during and especially after Brâncoveanu's era", the Păhărnicei and other such boyar retinues "will be more seriously engaged in productive life (in agriculture, in trades, etc.)." Brâncoveanu's reign was overall marked by a steady increase in taxation, but the Păhărnicei were explicitly excluded from some of the new duties, including a levy on vacated villages (siliști). Ligor proposes that this exemption reflected the Prince's military priorities, and his secret anti-Ottoman alliance with the Tsardom of Russia.

Brâncoveanu's first Paharnic was Staico Bucșanu, whose scheming against the regime ended with his public hanging at Bucharest's Outer Market. His public humiliation and killing were received with hostility by the Bucharest populace. The period thus inaugurated came with a set of administrative reforms, recorded in the princely register, or Anatefter. This shows Paharnic as one of the great offices, but also creates an overlapping function therein, as Cupar (from cupă, "cup"); at the top of boyar advancement, these two offices coexisted with Spatharios, Stolnic, Clucer, and another new office, that of Șufar (the intendant of kitchen staffs). Under Brâncoveanu, these particular offices were designated as Zvolearnici. In addition to receiving payment from the exercise of their offices, they relied on princely handouts, including kaftans colored in accordance with their function.

Until his own downfall in 1714, Brâncoveanu relied on various other noblemen to fill in Bucșanu's role. One of these, Cornea Brăiloiu, served the Prince as both ambassador and organizer of defense expeditions against the Kurucok. In 1696, the Greek Paharnic Vergo was part of a caretaker government of Caimacami. The following year, Brâncoveanu had another Greek Paharnic, Skarlatakes Mavrocordatos, son of the influential Alexander Mavrocordatos. In October, Skarlatakes married the Prince's daughter, Ilinca. Brâncoveanu also promoted Șerban II Cantacuzino as Paharnic, in which capacity Cantacuzino attended, in 1702, the formal meeting between the Prince and Baron Paget. Brăiloiu returned as Paharnic under the last Cantacuzino Prince, Ștefan, with increased powers that allowed him to set an arbitrary vinărici and "collect wine as he pleases".

Moldavia's own Paharnici and Păhărnicei greatly increased in number between 1550 and 1650; by 1710, some 24 were permanently present at the princely court in Iași, acting as waiters to the Moldavian Princes' foreign guests. Though the office's prestige declined, various Moldavian rulers maintained a practice of assigning it, alongside other offices, to their most trusted courtiers, often members of the monarchs' own families. Vasile Lupu (reigned 1634–1653) made his young nephew, Alexandru Coci, a Paharnic; meanwhile Lupu's in-laws, including Paharnici Alexandru Ciogolea and Neculai Mogâldea, were involved in conspiracies to topple him. Coci and his brother Enache were later tortured and killed by Lupu's rival, Gheorghe Ștefan, at the princely court in Podoleni. In the 1670s, holders of the Paharnic title included Ștefan Lupașcu Hâjdău, who was both a close relative and in-law of Prince Ștefan Petriceicu. The office of Cupar also existed in Moldavia, for instance during Petriceicu's successor Antonie Ruset, who assigned it to his brother Constantin. This function was alluded to in the canting arms used by the Rosetti family, which prominently feature a silver cup.

Moldavia also experienced a Cantacuzino ascendancy, which resulted in the promotion of Greek boyars, to the irritation of local competitors. The latter sentiment was notably expressed in the anti-Greek outburst of 1673, narrated favorably by chronicler Ion Neculce. It came shortly after Dumitrașcu Cantacuzino abdicated, and targeted his courtiers, notably the Paharnic Mavrodin, who was paraded on a donkey and made to speak shibboleth phrases in Romanian. Upon returning to the throne, Petriceicu maintained a court that included Greek boyars such as Ilie Stamatie, who was a Paharnic of Huși. By 1703, the Moldavian Cantacuzinos were in conflict with the Greek Prince Constantine Ducas, with Paharnic Ilie Cantacuzino fleeing the country. Brâncoveanu's contemporary Dimitrie Cantemir, a native boyar and Enlightened absolutist, strove to reform the old order, appointing distinguished soldiers, such as Adam Luca, as his Paharnici. Under Cantemir, the Postelnic was the seventh of eight boyars admitted to a privy council, while the Păhărnicei were inducted en masse into a category called boiernași ("little boyars"). His second and final reign was curbed by the Pruth River Campaign, during which Cantemir supported Russia. When he left into exile, he took with him Neculce and the Paharnic Gheorghiță, both of them against their will.

=== Phanariote reforms ===
1772 seal of a Wallachian Paharnic, Manolache Robe

Progressively over the 1710s, competing dynasties of culturally Greek aristocrats, collectively known as "Phanariotes", took power as Ottoman intermediaries in both Wallachia and Moldavia. The first such ruler, Nicholas Mavrocordatos, awarded tax privileges to the Paharnici, exempting them from the levy on siliști. The Păhărnicei continued to be a strong presence in the borderland region of Wallachia, where in 1729 they still had a corps and a captain. Overtures were made to tone down conflicts between the Romanians and the Greeks in Moldavia, such as when Grigore II Ghica refused to prosecute a treasonous Paharnic Gavriil. In 1754, Matei Ghica created more resources for the two Paharnici of Panciu, allowing them to collect half of the tax revenue previously kept by the Staroste. However, the erosion of Paharnici importance continued and was enhanced: under the same Matei Ghica, who ruled over both countries in succession, twenty Paharnici were created at each court. While some historians credit this anomaly to the Prince, others identify his Postelnic, Alexandros Soutzos, as the culprit.

Matei's predecessor, Mihai Racoviță, had redesigned the Wallachian table of ranks, making Paharnic the eighth position, within a second category of boyars. Accordingly, Paharnici were entitled to 40 scutelnici, or clients, and had a yearly salary of 960 thaler; by comparison, all boyars of the first class received 70 scutelnici and 1,680 thaler. As noted by historian Pompiliu Eliade, "an inflexible protocol govern[ed] the relationship between classes." Third-class boyars were required to bow down and kiss the hem of first-class superiors. Paharnici and others of the intermediary class were only expected to kiss their hand and display timidity in interactions. Under the new Phanariote regulations, these second-class aristocrats could not wear fur kaftans and had special kalpaks, surmounted by green cushions; their coats could only be colored in dark tones of green, blue, and brown, but, unlike inferior boyars, they were allowed to grow beards.

In parallel, scholar Nicolae Iorga notes, Wallachia's "old cursus honorum had yielded to personal assets or demands." Before 1796, the Paharnici had fallen to ninth or tenth place, but only because higher offices had been "doubled"—for instance, in 1768 there were two Wallachian Vornici. Another stratification occurred in Moldavia. There were 27 Paharnici at Grigore Callimachi's court: 13 enjoyed the full privileges; 14 were secondary (vtori-) and tertiary (treti-) Paharnici. There were still 14 Păhărnicei performing military duty at the Moldavian court in 1763. Their commander, now called Vătaf (plural: Vătafi), was a Greek boyar, Miche. Reduced to the role of rural legatees of the urban Paharnic, the Păhărnicei of both countries were then stripped of all their remaining tax privileges under Constantine Mavrocordatos; the Paharnici themselves were required to pay for any military levy. Nevertheless, these new norms also stipulated that holders of any boyar rank from the top 19 would be spared taxation. That privilege was also extended to three generations of their descendants, known as Mazili or Mazâli. A Western visitor, Friedrich Wilhelm von Bauer, assessed that Mavrocordatos' intervention had only left 100 Păhărnicei throughout Wallachia, with 12 more performing service for the Prince as Mazili. By 1760, the boyars, including three Paharnici, had lodged a formal complaint against Mavrocordatos with Sultan Mustafa III, accusing him of embezzlement.

Shortly after Mavrocordatos' death in the Russian occupation of 1769, the chronicler Franz Sulzer noted that the function of Moldavia's great Paharnic was to reside in Cotnari and collect revenue for Princess-dowager Ecaterina. The town, Sulzer noted, had greatly declined. Before 1810, the Paharnic had fallen to an even lesser position on the table of ranks of Moldavia. It was twelfth, although ahead of the Stolnic and Serdar. The Păhărnicei's Vătafi moved in the opposite direction and, by 1796, had been recognized as a component of Wallachia's fifth-class boyardom.

Paharnici and Păhărnicei also had a decorative function at the ceremonies in honor of Wallachia's Phanariote Princes, notably at the coronations of Alexander Ypsilantis (1775) and Nicholas Mavrogenes (1786), and the wedding of Princess Zamfira, daughter of John Caradja (1782). Some of the holders of the title focused their activity on cultural and educational projects. In Oltenia, Romanian or Greek schools were founded by local Paharnici, including Fota Vlădoianu (Craiova, 1777), Stan Jianu (Preajba, 1783), and Alexandru Farfara (Cerneți, 1793). The 1780s Paharnic Mihail Fotino, a Wallachian Greek, became noted for his contributions to jurisprudence and moral philosophy. By 1806, Toma Carra, the Moldavian Paharnic, was helping to draft a set of modernizing Pandects, to be used by Prince Alexander Mourouzis in reforming the justice system.

=== As a middle-class and nationalist layer ===
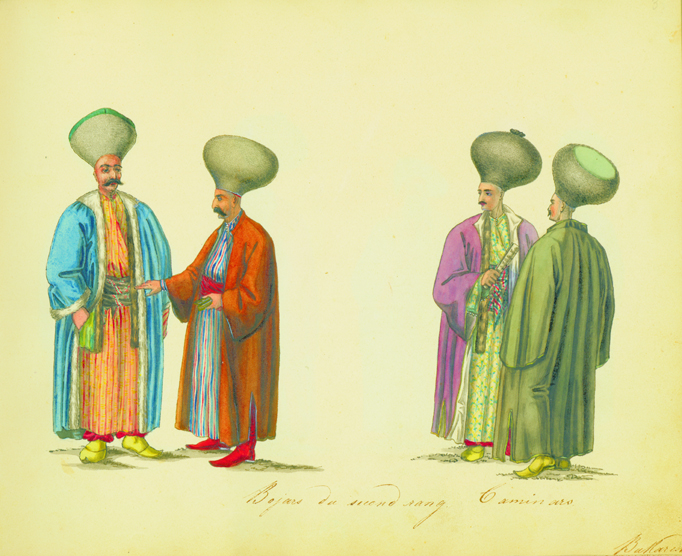
"Second-rank boyars" of Wallachia, depicted in 1825 by Auguste de Henikstein

Other Paharnici were primarily involved in administrative or entrepreneurial work. Under Prince John Mavrocordatos, the Bucharest caretakers, or ispravnici, comprised Paharnic Nicolae Ruset. In 1724, Paharnic Manolache owned one of the larger Bucharest bakeries. By 1804, Wallachian dignitaries included an Armenian businessman and Paharnic, Manuc Bei, made famous by his establishing of Manuc's Inn. In 1800, while reigning in Wallachia, Mourouzis appointed his Paharnic Ștefănică, alongside Constantin Pastia, to redesign a system for Bucharest's drainage and sewage. In 1819, Wallachian Prince Alexandros Soutzos ordered his Paharnic, Ianache Hafta, to carry out a modern surveying of Bucharest. Another Paharnic, Vasile Iconomu, helped Spatharios Gheorghe Vlahuț in capturing a gang of English counterfeiters. Moldavia's second-class boyars were similarly dedicated to commercial pursuits. Around 1740, Paharnic Radu Racoviță established a pioneering glass factory at Luizi-Călugăra. While ranked as Paharnici, Ioniță Cuza took up usury (1770s) and Ionică Tăutu became one of the major tenant farmers in Hotin County (1810).

Frictions between the Phanariotes and the provincial second-class boyars continued with some regularity. In one incident of 1799, Paharnic Constantin Bălăceanu of Ialomița County refused to carry out an order issued by Constantine Hangerli. Under Constantine Ypsilantis, another Ialomița Paharnic, Fălcoianu, was charged with embezzlement. With the era of national awakening, the Paharnici opposition to the Greeks extended to other classes of foreigners. In 1784, a Paharnic "Carpoff" made sustained efforts to block the penetration into Moldavia of Galician Armenians. Paharnic Manuc remained one of only three only Armenians to have reached a boyar rank in either country under the Phanariote reigns. During the war of 1806, a Wallachian Paharnic, Ștefan Belu, had a publicized conflict with the Bulgarians colonized at Lichirești, who were under the protection of Dimitrie Macedonski.

The Phanariote era also pushed Moldavia and Wallachia into the orbit of the Russian Empire, prompting some boyars to accept Russian suzerainty. In the 1760s, a Paharnic, Semyon Mikulin, moved to Novorossiya and was received into Russian nobility. In 1812, pursuant to the Treaty of Bucharest, eastern Moldavia was detached and assigned to Russia. This led to the creation of a Bessarabian Governorate which recognized Moldavian titles, including that of Paharnic, as the basis for inclusion into Russian nobility. Two of the earliest Bessarabian Paharnici were Nicolae Done and Toma Stamati. From a Wallachian family, Done served as judge in Hotin County during the early 1820s; Stamati, who took part in the inaugural gentry assembly, was the father of poet Constantin Stamati. Yet another Paharnic under Russian rule, Dinu Negruzzi of Șirăuți was the father of writer Costache Negruzzi.

Under late Phanariotes such as Wallachia's Caradja, the rank of a lesser Paharnic was openly trafficked: Hagi Ianuș, a merchant from Craiova, offered to purchase it at 400 ducats in 1816. By the time of Soutzos' death in 1821 there were six greater Paharnici in Wallachia, all of them present at his funeral. According to a note by visiting bureaucrat Ignaty Yakovenko, the number of scutelnici had increased, with each of these Paharnici commanding the allegiance of 25 clients; the Păhărnicei's Vătafi had three scultenici of their own.

The rise of Wallachian clienteles was again curbed in 1821 by an anti-boyar uprising, under Tudor Vladimirescu; having a peasant base, this insurgency was probably led by disgruntled third-class boyars. Also in 1821, the Phanariote warlord Alexander Ypsilantis, leading a "Sacred Band" of Greek revolutionaries, had taken control over Moldavia and parts of Wallachia. Ypsilantis' expedition sparked another Ottoman intervention, which provided a settling of scores between Romanians and Greeks. Second-class boyars played significant parts: according to Eliade, a Spatharios and a Paharnic traveled from one Moldavian town to another, replacing Ypsilantis' men with friendly locals. The Paharnic Gavril Istrati was involved alongside Sturdza in the fight against Sacred Band Greeks, at the head of a national party. At Zvoriștea, he organized a guerrilla force which flew red flags. It then marched on Botoșani, driving out the Greek insurgents.

=== Disintegration ===
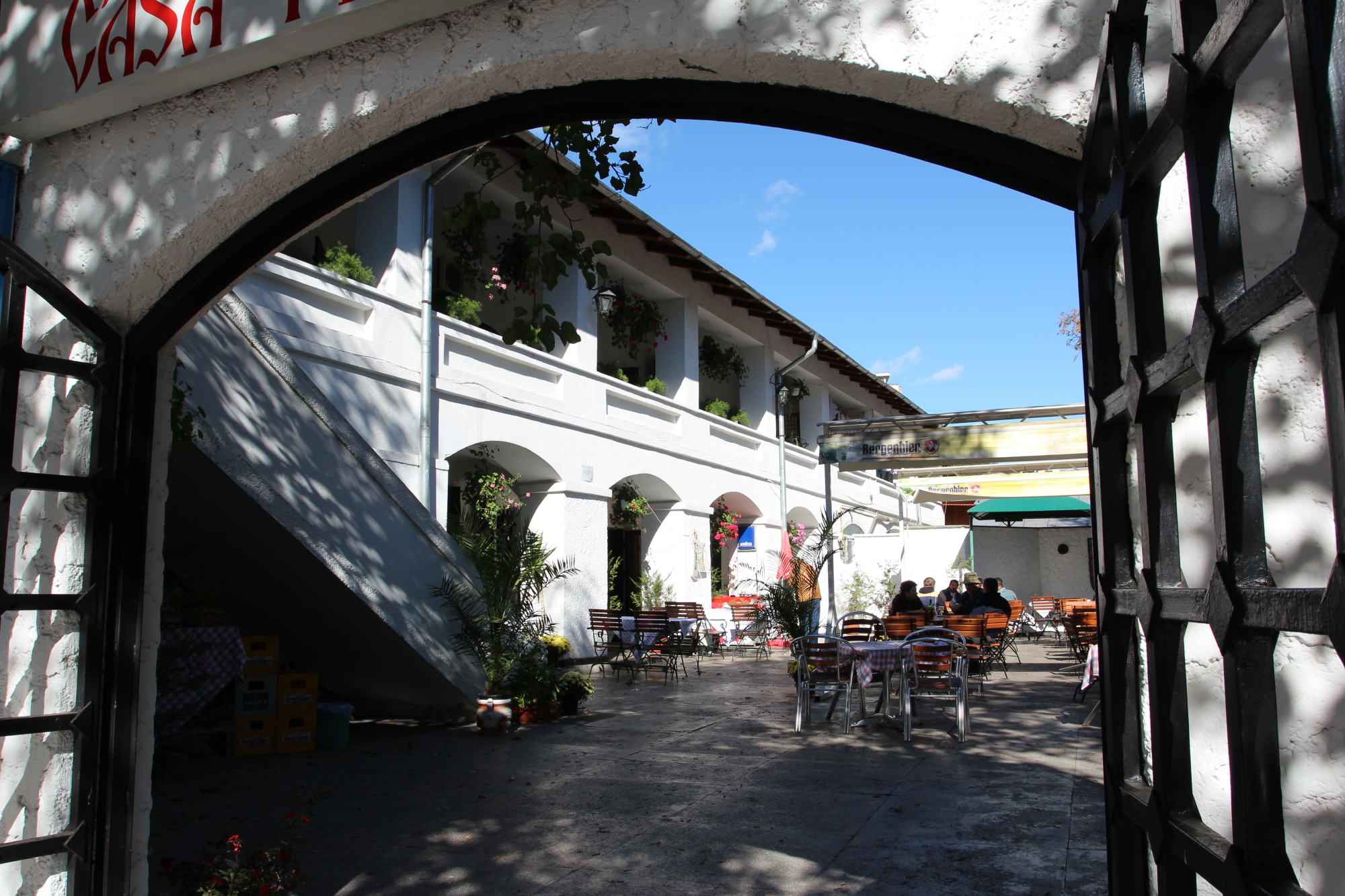
Casa Paharnicului in Piatra Neamț, 2012 photograph

Istrati's counterpart in Wallachia was Scarlat Cerchez, who organized the reception of Moldavia's first post-Phanariote Prince, Ioan Sturdza. Even before arriving in his capital, Sturdza rewarded the expectations of Romanian nationalists, inducting his partisans into the boyardom. By 1825, he had created 350 second-class boyars, Paharnici included. These changes perplexed Moldavia's first-class boyardom, whose delegates asked Mahmud II to mediate. Eventually, the Russo-Turkish War of 1828 drove Sturdza into exile in Bessarabia. This moment showed the tensions between the two aristocratic systems, as Sturdza began handing out titles to commoners, and allegedly created a house servant as Paharnic.

The post-Phanariote agitation ended as a lengthy Russian occupation of both principalities, providing them with a modernizing constitution known as Regulamentul Organic. Under this system, Paharnici were a seventh aristocratic rank, below Cluceri and ahead of Serdari. The Russian-appointed Moldavian Prince, Mihail Sturdza, replicated the policy of inducting new boyars, and, in 1835, raised most civil servants into the aristocracy: 140 Paharnici and 352 Serdari were counted in the census of 1849. In 1820, in Botoșani alone there were five Paharnici: Alexandru, Ion Brănișteanu, Necula Dalamaci, Gavril Istrati, and Sterie. By 1847, the same city held six Paharnici, none of them present in the older count. Nationality restrictions for Armenians were also lifted with the Treaty of Adrianople. As noted by scholar H. Dj. Siruni, 35 Armenians became Moldavian boyars in the subsequent social uplift, including Paharnici Hacic Cerchez at Roman and G. Țăranu at Botoșani.

Sturdza's measures were derided by the genealogist Constantin Sion, himself a Paharnic. According to Sion, Sturdza had managed to make boyars out of "the sons of butchers and publicans", and "condemned the country to fall under his companions". In one fragment of his genealogical tract, Sion confesses that he himself had taken a bribe to facilitate the ennobling of a priest's son, Iordachi Popa, also as a Paharnic. The spread of liberal and radical ideas influenced such perceptions, leading up to the abortive coup of 1848. During the preceding crisis in 1846, the Paharnic Teodor Sion (Constantin Sion's brother) was arrested, alongside Spahtarios Tucidide Durmuz, for having joined Teodor Râșcanu's attempt at tax resistance against Sturdza.

The Wallachian and Moldavian military forces were both restructured, though some importance was paid to the old table of ranks and the concept of Mazili. As such, the radical conspirator Ion Câmpineanu was allowed to serve as a Wallachian Major because of his descent from a Paharnic. By 1841, the role of Paharnici in Bucharest's government had been formalized, with Paharnic Scarlat Rosetti serving as City Council President. Other boyars of that rank continued to be involved primarily in trade. Pitești was home to a Paharnic Berindei, who, by 1855, was a major player in Wallachia's pork trade. In Moldavia's Piatra Neamț, the era is commemorated by a former manor-and-warehouse, known as Casa Paharnicului ("House of the Paharnic"). It was built by the boyar and grain trader Dimitrie C. Gheorghiadis, who held the office for only part of his career.

The title was also held in the 1830s and '40s by two inspector-generals of Wallachia's schools, Ion Heliade Rădulescu and Constantin N. Brăiloiu, as well as by painter Constantin Lecca. The former complained that the appointment was insignificant, since such titles were being offered to all educated youth, turning each one into a "servant of the servants, a nobody among the nobodies." Before the Wallachian Revolution of 1848, which sought to outlaw boyar ranks, the father of revolutionary Gheorghe Magheru also served as Paharnic and administrator of Romanați County. Another Paharnic, the poet Grigore Alexandrescu, discarded his rank and job in the bureaucracy to participate in the revolutionary events.

The revolution was defeated, but Russian influence was curbed from 1853, with the Crimean War. Under the regime of Prince Barbu Dimitrie Știrbei, Wallachian revolutionaries were allowed back home from exile. They included the Paharnic Rădulescu, who alternated roles between civilian boyar and general in the Ottoman Army. Eventually, all boyar ranks and tax privileges were ended by the Convention of Paris (1858), which also opened the way for a Moldo–Wallachian union in 1859. The title continued to be used in the 1860s by those who already held it, including jurists Gheorghe Lehliu and Barbu Slătineanu.
