= Ioniță Cuza =

Moldavian statesman and political conspirator

Ioniță (Ioan) Cuza
- Spatharios figure from the arms used by Ioan Cuza, possibly symbolizing grandfather Ioniță

Stolnic of Moldavia
- In office 1759–1763

Paharnic of Moldavia
- In office 1769–1773

Personal details
- Born: ca. 1715
- Died: August 18, 1778 Iași, Moldavia
- Spouse: Tudosica Râșcanu (died 1775)
- Relations: Dumitrașco Cuza (grandfather); Ioniță Costin (grandfather); Miron Cuza (father); Toader Râșcanu (father-in-law)
- Children: Nicolae Cuza; Arghirie Cuza; Gheorghe I Cuza; Constantin Cuza

Military service
- Allegiance: Moldavia
- Years of service: 1774–1778
- Rank: Spatharios
- Commands: Moldavian military forces

Ion Cuza or Cuzea, commonly known as Ioniță Cuza (ca. 1715 – August 18, 1778), was a Moldavian statesman and political conspirator, remembered as one of the first Romanian nationalists and Freemasons. His paternal family, the Cuzas (Cuzeas), were landowners of uncertain origin who, by the time of Ioniță's birth, had been established into the boyardom, being under the patronage of Doukas and Sturdza aristocrats. Ioniță's mother was a direct descendant of the statesman-chronicler Miron Costin; his father, Miron Cuza, had been involved in the pro-Habsburg conspiracy headed by François Ernaut, while his grandfather, Dumitrașco Cuzea, had been hanged during the clampdown. As boyars, both the Cuzas and the Costins opposed the Phanariote regime and devised other schemes to emancipate Moldavia from the Ottoman Empire.

Ioniță was at the forefront of this fight in 1759, when he managed to contain the actions of Prince Ioan Teodor Callimachi and his courtier Iordaki Stavraki. He was deceived by the latter into leading a diplomatic mission into the Crimean Khanate, where he was briefly imprisoned. After the resulting uprising in his favor, Cuza managed to expel Stavraki from Moldavia. He was propelled to high office, serving for years as the Moldavian Stolnic. In 1767, Cuza also had a standoff with Grigore III Ghica, who finally agreed to grant him and other native boyars access to higher offices, and thus earned Cuza's enduring political support. He was Paharnic before and during the Russo-Turkish War of 1768, returning as Spatharios, or commander of the Moldavian military forces, during Ghica's second and final reign. While conserving his standing in regional politics, Cuza built a large estate of his own, with clusters of villages in both Fălciu County and Bessarabia.

Cuza was finally executed, with Manolache Bogdan, after both were caught up in the intrigues against Prince Constantine Mourouzis. He was survived by five sons. Through one of them, Ioniță was the great-grandfather of Alexandru Ioan Cuza, Romanian nationalist campaigner and Domnitor of the United Principalities. His reign saw several rapprochements between the Cuzas and the Mourouzis, all of which created controversy and returned focus on Ioniță's rebellion. Another one of Ioniță's sons was the great-grandfather of A. C. Cuza, the antisemitic doctrinaire.

== Biography ==
=== Origins ===
Ioniță Cuza's ethnic origins and ancestry are largely uncertain, subject to several competing theories. Some early hypotheses, centered on the name's resonance, have proposed that the Cuzas were Italians or Lorrainers. Historian N. Stoicescu believes that they were possibly ethnic Greeks. According to genealogist Ștefan S. Gorovei, Ioniță's ancestry is entirely local and can be traced back to January 1588, with the first mention of a "Cozea" from Roșiori. This figure, identified by Gorovei as the Cuza patriarch, made lucrative land deals in other parts of Neamț County, leaving a fortune to his sons. One of these may be Toader Cuza, who is shown to be engaged in commercial exchanges with the boyar Toader Jora. Another genealogist, Gheorghe G. Bezviconi, proposes that the Joras and the Cuzas had a common ancestor, the Vornic Băisan. The family may have branched out into Bessarabia at an early stage, with records showing them as founders and owners of the village Cozești. Unusually among Moldavian boyars, the Cuzas seem not to have adopted a coat of arms of their own. A tierced per fess shield is attributed to them by heraldists such as Mateiu Caragiale and Emanoil Hagi-Moscu, but is presumed by historian Sorin Iftimi to be a late-19th-century invention.

The first Cuza to reach high office may have been a Vistier Coza, serving in the 1630s. According to Stoicescu, he was father of the better-known Dumitrașco Cuza (or Cuzea). Contrarily, Gorovei argues that there is "no certain connection" between the Vistier and Dumitrașco, who was the known heir of Toader Cuza. It is also known that Dumitrașco married Safta, daughter of Toader Jora and sister-in-law of the Great Vornic Ioan Sturza (of the Greek Sturdzas). One period writ describes him as the son of Safta Jora. This dynastic arrangement also made Cuza a relative of the powerful Doukas and brought him a large dowry, including 15 estates in Moldavia-proper and Bessarabia. He had a steady climb at the court, being first mentioned in June 1677 as Comis for Prince Antonie Ruset, granted ownership of Vlăicenii village in recognition for his service. He became Spatharios in 1679, under George Ducas, returning as Great Stolnic and Great Spatharios under Constantine Ducas.

Dumitrașco also cultivated a close relationship with the Costin boyars, and in particular with Hetman Ioniță Costin, orphaned son of the writer and politician Miron Costin. Cuza's own three sons, Miron, Toader and Velicico, were involved in cementing such links. Miron Cuza (fl. 1680–1742) may have been named after Ioniță's father. Holding office as Logothete, he married Ilinca, daughter of Ioniță Costin, granddaughter of his namesake and niece of Nicolae Costin. The Costins had been one of the most powerful players after the Moldavian Magnate Wars, keeping Princes as the "instruments of [their] party". Through her mother Ileana, Ilinca also descended from Movilești royalty, whose coat of arms was sometimes attributed to her Cuza descendants.

In 1701–1702, Cuza Sr and the Hetman tried to mediate a conflict between Prince Ducas and his Spatharios, Mihai Racoviță. Instead, they came to be detested by the latter. Cuza was sidelined later that year, when Racoviță managed to topple and replace Ducas. Over the following decades, Phanariote bureaucrats acting under the supervision of the Ottoman Empire instituted a regime which cut back on the privileges of established boyar families. Racoviță participated in its creation, returning to rule as a Phanariote in December 1715. However, in 1716, Moldavia was dragged into the Austro–Turkish War. Racoviță and his Seimeni "put up no resistance" to the Imperial Army, which then imposed terror on the city of Iași.

Following this regime change, Miron and Velicico involved themselves in a plot to topple Racoviță, alongside boyar Vasile Ceaurul and the mercenary François "Franță" Ernaut. In January 1717, the Seimeni defeated Ernaut, and resumed control of the country. Racoviță ordered Cuza Sr's hanging on the scrânciob ("cradle") prepared outside the princely court, in what was seen by chronicler Ion Neculce as a blind retaliation for his sons' doings. His body was dropped in a mass grave by the side of Cetățuia Monastery. The three younger Cuzas escaped vengeance, but were kept out of political affairs; Toader's sons declined socially, losing their boyar status.

=== Career ===
==== Rise ====
The son of Miron and Ilinca, Ioniță was born at an unknown date, referred to by historians as "before 1720" or "around 1715". He is known to have had a brother, Mihalache, who is recorded as deceased before 1760. His grandfather Costin died late in 1729, leaving Miron an heir to much of his estate. According to an oral tradition attested among the peasants of Trifești-Neamț, Miron, also referred to as Cuza Bărbosul ("Cuza the Bearded"), was "slaughtered by the Prince" (whose name is not given) at Roman. In 1742–1748, Ioniță was a Postelnic, and then a Pitar to 1752, being consulted by Prince Constantine Mavrocordatos during the abolition of Moldavian serfdom (April 1749). The same year, he and other boyars sent three letters of protest to Abdullah Pasha, the Ottoman Grand Vizier, demanding less taxation for locals, and fewer privileges for the foreign merchants. According to Gorovei, these letters should be seen as early documents of Romanian nationalism, with Ioniță Cuza included on "something one may call the 'national party', or the homegrown party".

The Pitar's anti-Phanariote sentiments were recorded under the reign of Ioan Teodor Callimachi, whose Spatharios, Iordaki Stavraki, blacklisted Cuza. In 1759, the same Stavraki devised a plan to have Cuza and other 11 boyars removed, sending them on diplomatic mission to the Crimean Khanate, where they were to be kidnapped. One report suggests that they were in fact sent there, and arrested on arrival, finding themselves imprisoned at Yeni-Kale. The plan was foiled when the other boyars rebelled: as noted by Cuza himself, they had support "from the whole country", obtaining Stavraki's removal and exile; Cuza then reconciled with the Prince, taking over as Stolnic. He was simultaneously Stolnic and Vistier to 1763, also serving as the Ispravnic of Vaslui from 1761 to 1767.

As the head of his house, Ioniță was ktitor of the Moldavian Orthodox church in Negrești. Recognized for his philanthropy, in 1762 he received from the widow Safta Racleș the neighboring village of Bârzești. Around that time, he engaged in litigation over land with Vasile Crudul of Orhei, reportedly forcing the latter to seek a loan from Turkish usurers, who then wished to abduct his son as collateral. After 1770, Cuza himself became implicated in controversial credit ventures, earning the reputation of a usurer. The deeds he held in Negrești and Bârzești became the basis for a large Cuza domain, which also included Zăpodeni and Rebricea; he had inherited additional land in Cuzlău, as well as townhouses in Vaslui and Iași. Cuza married a daughter of Pitar Toader Râșcanu, Tudosica or Todosica (died 1775), with whom he had five sons and two daughters, whose birth dates he recorded in one of the few surviving private register of births. This matrimonial arrangement made him brothers-in-law with Constantin, Ioan and Alexandru Râșcanu. Of Ioniță and Tudosica's children, four sons are known to have survived into maturity: Nicolae (or Neculai), Arghirie, Gheorghe and Constantin. All were educated at home, by tutors from Golia Monastery.

By 1767, Cuza was again in conflict with the Phanariote regime, which at the time was personified by prince Grigore III Ghica. He and other boyars declared themselves outraged at being sidelined from major offices, and left the country on voluntary exile. The Ottoman envoy, or Kapucu, intervened as mediator; the protesters returned after being promised reparations. Thus, Cuza himself returned to prominence. From 1769 to 1773, he served as Paharnic, ending his term under the early stages of a Russian occupation. These events created major problems for the family, which saw its Bessarabian estates, including Cozești, confiscated by Russia. The period saw Cuza working with other boyars to limit Phanariote abuses by resorting to Russian and Ottoman arbitration under the terms of Küçük Kaynarca. In August 1774, the boyars, gathered at Focșani, nominated Cuza and Enachi Chirica as their envoys to Istanbul, where they were to ask for Ghica's return as Prince. Sultan Abdul Hamid I confirmed Ghica for the throne before they left, rendering their mission redundant.

==== Rebellion and execution ====
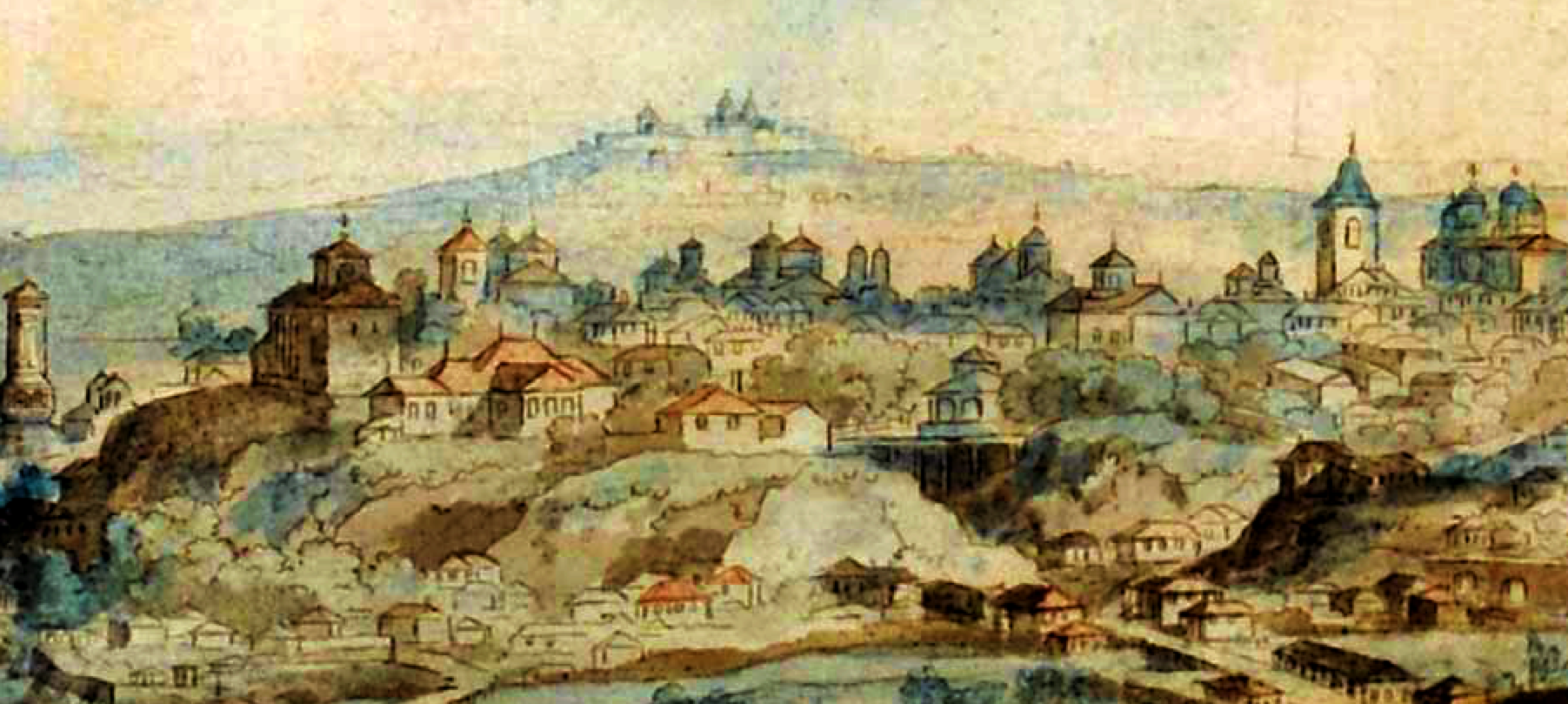
Cityscape of Iași in 1793, by Gabriel Sergeev

Cuza was appointed as Ghica's Spatharios later in 1774. The reign was nevertheless one of major setbacks, beginning with the forced cession of northern Moldavia, annexed by the Habsburg monarchy and administered as part of Galicia–Lodomeria. The Prince was assassinated in 1777, with Constantine Mourouzis taking his throne. Cuza preserved his rank and office, but began conspiring against the new monarch. As noted by historian Cristian Ploscaru, he and Manolache Bogdan formed a boyar "brotherhood" with figures such as Lupu Balș, Grigore Crupenschi, Constantin Greceanu, and Alexandru Neculce, with some additional involvement by Constantin Sturdza.

Various foreign sources indicate that the project was of a Masonic inspiration, which would push the history of Freemasonry in Romania to 1770 or even before, to 1740. Scholar Giorge Pascu argues that, especially through Bogdan, the conspirators were tied to Jean-Louis Carra. A French adventurer in Moldavia, and a mordant critic of Prince Grigore, Carra revealed himself as belonging to the French Masonic chapters in 1790, but, Pascu argues, "had been won over by the Freemasonry from the very beginning of his 'career'." This claim is rendered with precaution by another scholar, Neagu Djuvara. Though he notes that Carra may have well been a Freemason, he argues that, given "his very short stay in Moldavia" and his "quite unfriendly" rapport with the locals, he could not have instigated a movement. Historian Cătălina Opaschi reports that documents showing Cuza's Masonic pledges were uncovered in 1883 in Italy, suggesting that the movement was of peninsular origin. A lodge called Marte, obedient to the Russian branch of Freemasonry, existed at Iași from April 1772.

According to Gorovei, Cuza's scheme involved deposing Mourouzis and placing Bogdan on the throne. Another historian, Nicolae Iorga, attributes the initiative to a low-ranking boyar, Iordachi Darie Dărmănescu, Cuza and other boyars being only drawn in by their "politicking". Various other researches have also noted that Dărmănescu was a key figure in the import of Enlightenment philosophy and modernizing political literature to Moldavia, while writer D. V. Barnoschi sees him as the founder of Romanian liberalism.

Mourouzis was informed of the Bogdan–Cuza–Dărmănescu intrigue, and retaliated: Bogdan and Cuza were apprehended and interrogated under torture by another Spatharios, Constantin Caragea. Exposed to a similar treatment, Dărmănescu admitted to having sent a letter to the Ottoman authorities in Bender, asking for arbitration against Mourouzis. He also incriminated Cuza, who was one of the boyars to have signed that document. Historian A. D. Xenopol notes that Cuza was mainly targeted not for actually siding with Bogdan, but for having protested against the Ottoman army's raids in Moldavia. Prince Mourouzis had also found the Ottoman presence unpalatable, but, Xenopol writes, regarded Cuza's additional complaints as dangerously excessive. Cuza and Bogdan spent their final days chained to a wall in a dungeon at Iași's princely court, facing the Bahlui River.

The two boyars finally were decapitated on August 18, 1778. Contemporary records suggest that they were killed at night in the Bahlui dungeon; their executioner was a Captain Pavăl from Cosăuți, who then left the severed heads exposed for public viewing, "on a rug by the gate of the court". Dărmănescu received more clemency from the Prince: originally sentenced to have his right arm amputated, he was eventually dispatched to a monastery in Târgu Ocna. Released before 1783, he dedicated himself to translating Masonic literature. Other participants were also given less violent punishments, following requests from the clergy: some, such as the boyars' physician Dracache Depasta, were exiled and had their estates confiscated. Carra, who continued to defy Ghica, was finally ordered to leave Moldavia in February 1776.

== Legacy ==
Romanian folklore commemorated the Spatharios with a lengthy ballad, which was probably composed shortly after his execution. The fatherless family, including a nine-year old youngest son Ioan, was again left exposed to poverty and persecution—though an oral tradition, relayed by Alexandru Cantacuzino in 1856, has it that Prince Constantine lived to regret his violent deeds and, as one of his final acts, "gave back to the Bogdan and Cuza children their confiscated assets". Gheorghe Cuza (1762–1831), who inherited Bârzești, also held the office of Spatharios in 1813; married to Ralu Alcaz, he had a daughter, Ecaterina Cuza-Vârnav (died 1872). A second-generation liberal, he continued his father's feud with the Mourouzis family, as well as the penchant for conspiratorial "anti-Greek" politics. In 1803, having made public his intention of taking the Moldavian throne for himself, he signed a protest against the incumbent, Alexander Mourouzis, who had him arrested. During the same interval, Russia reassigned his Bessarabian villages to the Balș family.

Gheorghe and his brothers were instrumental in the process which led to the removal of Phanariote Princes, endorsing the nationalist memorandum of Ioniță Sandu Sturdza, who then became Prince. Gheorghe then had a conflict with Sturdza: supporting the constitutionalist Ionică Tăutu, he was detained for a while at Pângărați. The Cuza properties suffered damages in 1821, when the Ottoman army followed the Sacred Band on Moldavian territory. They were later passed on to Gheorghe's son-in-law, Vornic Costachi Vârnav (distantly related to the politician Scarlat Vârnav). Arghirie (1758–1826) and his wife Ileana Kostaki were based in Hotin County, from 1812 annexed to Russia, alongside other parts of Moldavia, as the Bessarabia Governorate. The couple's two daughters married, respectively, into the Rosetti and Miclescu families. Constantin, who remained in Vaslui, became through his marriage the uncle of poet Vasile Alecsandri.

Gheorghe, Arghirie and Constantin's male lines were extinguished before 1850, but the one starting with Nicolae Cuza (1755–1806) survived into the 20th century. With his Greek wife Nastasia Ziloti, Nicolae had sons Gheorghe (1780–1835) and Ioan (1785–1848); a third, Grigore (1800–1869), died childless. Ioan and Grigore both held offices as Ispravnici under the Regulamentul Organic regime, but were liberals, deeply involved in the Moldavian revolution of 1848. From 1851, Grigore served as Moldavia's Minister of Education, in which capacity he pushed for both institutional modernization and Romanian nationalism. During this epoch, Ioan Cuza used a seal which showed a sabred figure—presumed by Iftimi to have represented ancestor Ioniță. He married a Phanariote lady, Sultana Cozadini (1785–1865), impoverished member of the Gozzadini and Scanavis families, with roots leading back into the Duchy of the Archipelago.

Ioan and Sultana were parents to the most distinguished Cuza of the 19th century, Alexandru Ioan. A Colonel in the Moldavian military forces and participant in the 1848 revolt, he became friends and fellow inmates with Alecu Moruzi, who was a grandson of Prince Constantine. Cuza sided with the National Party in the ad-hoc Divan. That assembly elected him Moldavian Prince, then Domnitor of the United Principalities (nucleus of modern Romania), in 1859. In its validation of the election, the Divan informed Cuza that the country had a "debt of honor to your family", and that it wished to "compensate the blood your ancestors have shed for the noble liberties". In late 1861, Mihail Kogălniceanu reminded deputies of this pledge, as part of a speech against Alecu Moruzi, who was at the time Moldavia's Prime Minister, and who, Kogălniceanu alleged, was not a Moldavian national. The allusion was picked up by Românulŭ newspaper, who noted that Kogălniceanu was directly referring to Ioniță's killing. A dispute erupted between Kogălniceanu and Grigore Cuza, who defended Moruzi's nationality rights—this paradox was also highlighted in Românulŭ.

According to historian Gheorghe Ghibănescu, Ioniță and his sons were "planted" in the Moldavian soil, a "trunk" for Alexandru Ioan's growth. The latter was allegedly a Freemason, though the circumstances of his initiation remain unclear. However, shortly before the 1866 coup which toppled him, the Domnitor surrounded himself mostly with his Cozadini relatives, who became a camarilla; Alecu Moruzi also remained close to this circle. Alexandru Ioan Cuza's line existed for one more generation after his death in exile, ending in March 1890, when his surviving son, the pretender Alexandru "Sașa" Cuza, died in Madrid. He had been married to Alecu Moruzi's daughter Maria—a matter which stirred much controversy, particularly after she took ownership of Cuza estates.

The Domnitor's uncle Gheorghe (the second) was the grandfather of the Bessarabian opera singer Valentina Cuza-Bleichmann, as well as of another political figure, A. C. Cuza. Originally a socialist, the latter Cuza first achieved notoriety in 1910, when he put out the "first publicly antisemitic program". He founded the National-Christian Defense League, then the National Christian Party. The latter group also involved his son, also named Gheorghe. A published sonneteer, and son-in-law of politician Iancu Flondor, he vied with other figures for control of the antisemitic movement from 1935. Both father and son were directly involved in persecuting the Romanian Jews, in particular during and after the 1941 Iași pogrom. By then, the 1778 conspiracy had been revisited by Barnoschi, with a novel which appeared in early 1937. Of the landmarks still associated with Ioniță, the manor in Bârzești was purchased in 1892 by the Ioanid family. It was nationalized, then demolished, under the communist regime.
