= La Trompetist Inn =

- Hanul „La Trompetist”
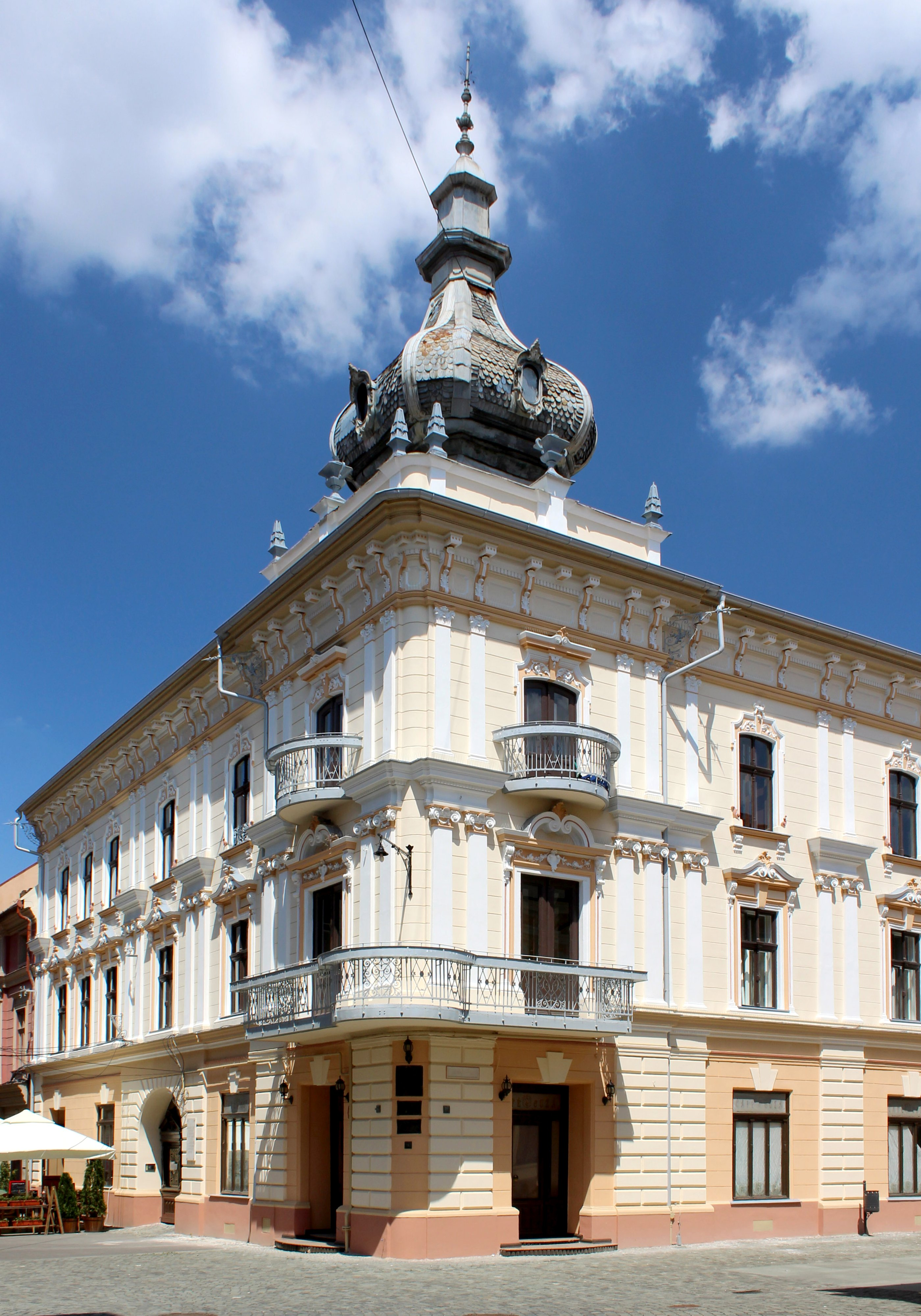
- Interactive map of the La Trompetist Inn area
- Former names: Hungária Hotel
- Alternative names: Cuza House

General information
- Architectural style: Eclectic/Historicist
- Location: 6 Bishop Augustin Pacha Street, Timișoara, Romania
- Coordinates: 45°45′24″N 21°13′48″E
- Completed: Early 18th century
- Renovated: 1894

La Trompetist Inn, also known among locals as Cuza House, is a historical building in the Cetate district of Timișoara, Romania, in the immediate vicinity of Union Square. It has hosted, since 1719, the inn and tavern La Trompetist (German: Der Trompeter; "The Trumpeter)," hence the name, which was considered a luxury hotel and also the most sought-after place to stay and spend free time in the city.

== History ==
La Trompetist Inn, named after its first owner, Friedrich Gram—a former trumpeter in the imperial army from Braunschweig and a member of the city's German magistrature since 1718—is listed among the 13 restaurants that received the right to operate through an act of the city magistrate on 11 September 1719. By 1747, the building belonged to judge Anton Seltmann and consisted of a single floor. It served as a key stop for postmen traveling between Sibiu and Vienna and became a city landmark thanks to its prominent location and unique name. Over time, the inn changed its name to the La Trompetă Hotel. Around 1780, records indicate that a room with a bed cost 15 kreutzers, while a full meal was priced at approximately 10 kreutzers.

At the end of the 19th century, the building was completely reconstructed and a new floor was added by its new owner, Gyula Illits. Following the completion of the work—officially permitted on 13 March 1894—the hotel resumed operations under its new name, Hungária Hotel. At that time, it offered 50 elegant rooms and modern amenities, including bathrooms with running water.

The inn's emblem features a soldier trumpeter on horseback, crafted from perforated iron sheet that was originally gilded. This figure is set within a rectangular iron frame, constructed from two parallel iron bands held together by slightly convex iron washers. The top of the frame is adorned with leaf-shaped decorations made of iron sheet, attached to an arched support. Similar leaf motifs appear along the bottom, though in a simpler form. At each corner of the frame, the design includes eight rose motifs—four on the front and four on the back. The frame surrounding the trumpeter is painted red. The piece was displayed at the 1873 Vienna World's Fair and entered the collection of the Banat Museum on 6 July 1891.

== Architecture ==
Architecturally, the building was originally constructed in the Baroque style, though it now displays elements of an eclectic, historicist aesthetic. The first-floor windows are framed by Ionic pilasters, while the second-floor windows are flanked by Corinthian pilasters. At the top, the windows are adorned with neo-Baroque decorative elements.

== Guests and legends ==
Among the notable guests hosted by the La Trompetă Hotel is Mihai Eminescu, commemorated by a plaque on the building that reads, "Mihai Eminescu came with Pascaly's troupe for a performance in the city." According to legend, Prince Alexandru Ioan Cuza also stayed at the hotel between 7 and 8 March 1866, as he awaited a train to begin his exile in Central Europe. He was accompanied by his wife Elena, their adopted sons Alexandru and Dimitrie, and his aide, Colonel Nicolae Pisoski. Because of this connection, the building is also known as Cuza House and, until recently, housed a café named "Café Cuza." At the corner of the building, a bas-relief effigy and inscription commemorate Alexandru Ioan Cuza's passage through Timișoara. Each January, members of the Roma community traditionally lay a wreath of flowers in his honor, recognizing him as the one who freed them from slavery—despite the historical fact that the Roma were officially emancipated in Wallachia in 1856, during the rule of Barbu Știrbei.

Another notable guest of the inn was Emperor Franz I of Austria, who stayed here from 12 to 14 May 1807, accompanied by Archduke Karl. In the years that followed, his successor, Emperor Franz Joseph I, also chose the inn as his residence during visits to the Banat region. The Austrian imperial treasure was also hidden here, during the anti-Napoleonic wars, guarded by the civic guard.

According to local folklore, the inn's restaurant was the scene of intense card games, where, as the story goes, the father of poet Nikolaus Lenau—an official in the Habsburg administration in Timișoara—lost half his fortune due to his passion for gambling.
