= Roznovanu Palace =

Heritage site in Iași, Romania

Coordinates: 47.161671°N 27.584138°E

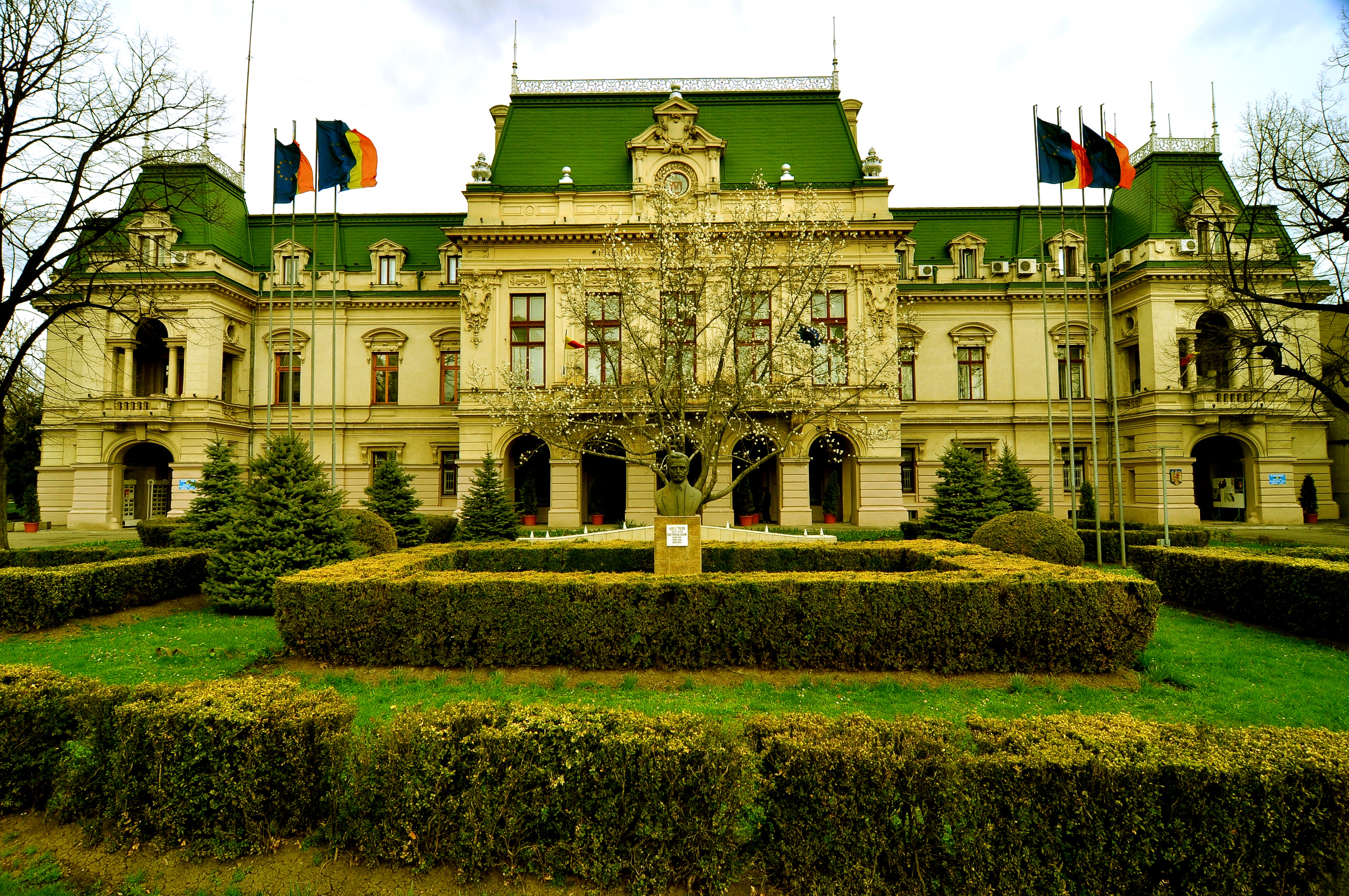
Roset-Roznovanu Palace, Iași

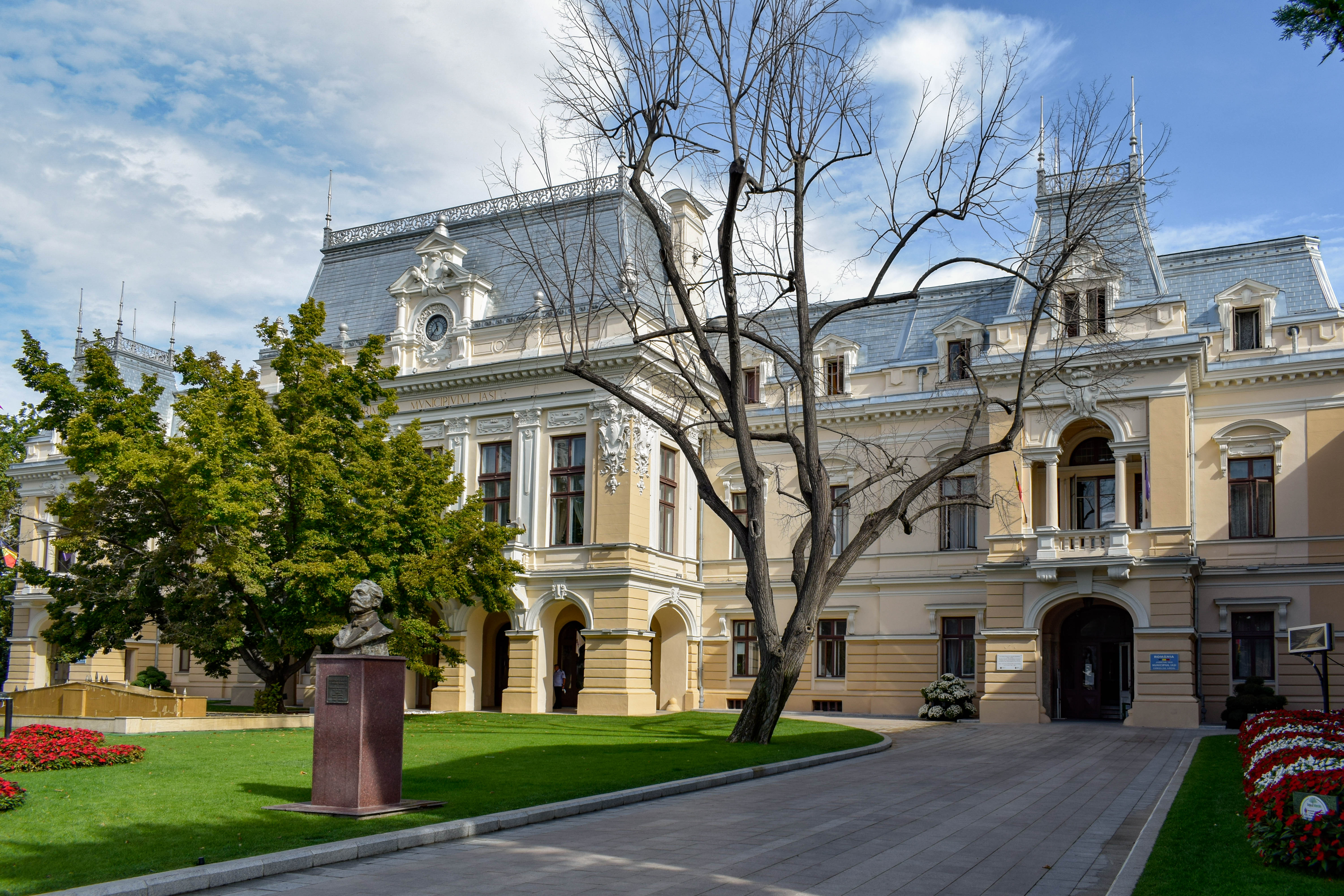
The Roznovanu Palace in 2020

The Roznovanu Palace or Roset-Roznovanu Palace (Romanian: Palatul Roznovanu or Palatul Roset-Roznovanu) is an edifice located in Iași, Romania. It was built in the second half of the 18th century, and rebuilt between 1830 and 1833, by Iordache Ruset-Roznovanu, a member of the Rosetti family. During World War I, it hosted the Romanian government. Today, it hosts the Iași City Hall.

The Roset-Roznovanu Palace is listed in the National Register of Historic Monuments.
