= Elena Cuza =

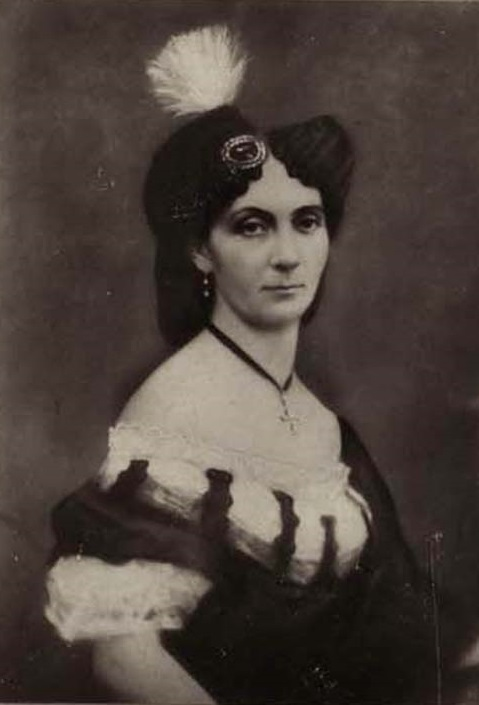

Princess of the United Principalities
- Tenure: 24 January 1859 – 11 February 1866
- Born: 17 June 1825; Iaşi, Moldavia
- Died: 2 April 1909 (aged 83); Piatra Neamț, Romania
- Burial: Solești, Romania
- Spouse: Prince Alexandru Ioan Cuza
- House: Cuza (by marriage)
- Father: Iordache Rosetti
- Mother: Ecaterina Sturdza
- Religion: Eastern Orthodoxy

Elena Cuza (17 June 1825 – 2 April 1909), also known under her semi-official title Elena Doamna, was a Moldavian, later Romanian noblewoman and philanthropist. She was princess consort of the United Principalities and the wife of Alexandru Ioan Cuza, the first Romanian prince.

== Biography ==
Royal Monogram of Princess Elena

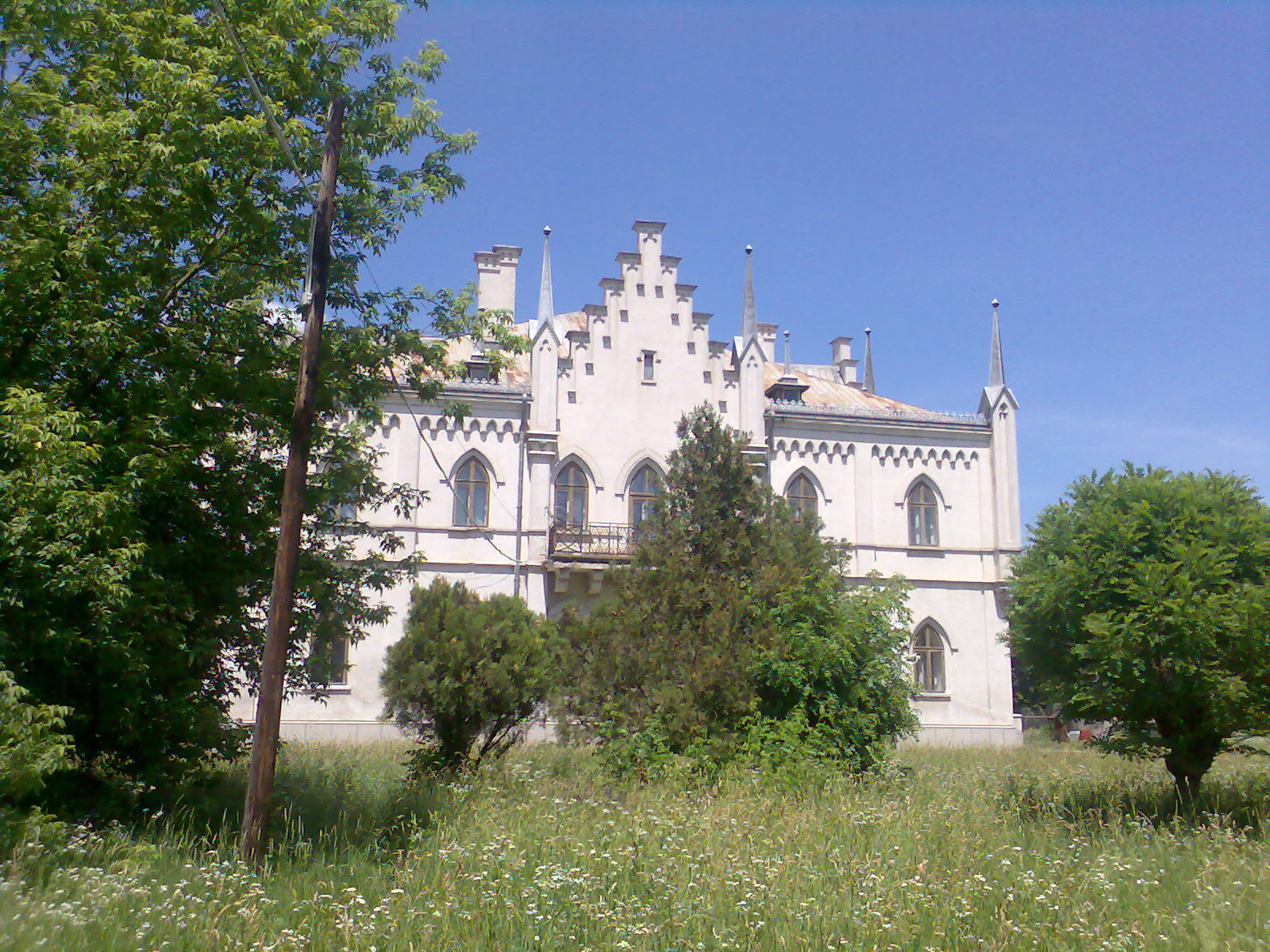
The Cuza palace

Born in Iași, as a member of a high-ranking Boyar Rosetti family, she was the daughter of Postelnic Prince Iordache Rosetti-Solescu (1796-1846) and his wife, Princess Ecaterina Sturdza (d. 1869). By blood, she was closely related to almost all Romanian noble families. In 1844 she married Cuza — their relationship soured soon after, as Elena was not able to bear a child. However, she later raised as her own children his two sons by his mistress, Elena Maria Catargiu-Obrenović, who was also her cousin.

She remained, however, very devoted to her husband in their public life, and was responsible for securing his flight from the country in 1848, after Prince Mihail Sturdza began arresting participants in the Moldavian revolutionary movement. They returned after the start of Grigore Alexandru Ghica's rule, but Elena suffered from depression after Cuza began engaging in adulterous affairs and left for Paris, France until 1853. After her return, she became almost completely estranged from her husband, who kept as his mistress Elena Maria Catargiu-Obrenović, the mother of Milan Obrenović (future King of Serbia).

Elena left for Paris and remained there until 1862, long after the ad hoc Divan had elected Cuza ruler; she had been persuaded to do so by the writer and political figure Vasile Alecsandri, who tried to extinguish the scandal provoked by Cuza's marital neglect. As wife of the head of state, she became noted for her charity work (the building of the Elena Doamna Asylum in Cotroceni, Bucharest) and adopted orphans, including the illegitimate children of her husband — Alexandru Al. Ioan Cuza and Dimitrie Cuza; Elena Cuza took over, furnished, and maintained the private residence in Ruginoasa, Iași County, and was responsible for the Neo-Gothic style of its decorations.

During the coup d'état against her husband (22 February 1866), she was isolated in her apartments by the conspirators, who burst in on Cuza as he was spending the night with Maria Catargi-Obrenović. Both she and Maria joined Cuza in his European exile. After her husband's death in 1873, she took care of their children, and lived to see the death of her two adoptive sons (Alexandru, was the husband of Maria Moruzi (1863-1921) — she was later married, for just one day, with the National Liberal leader Ion I. C. Brătianu, and gave birth to the historian and politician Gheorghe I. Brătianu).
