= Alexandru Al. Ioan Cuza =

Romanian pretender and newspaperman

- Pretender
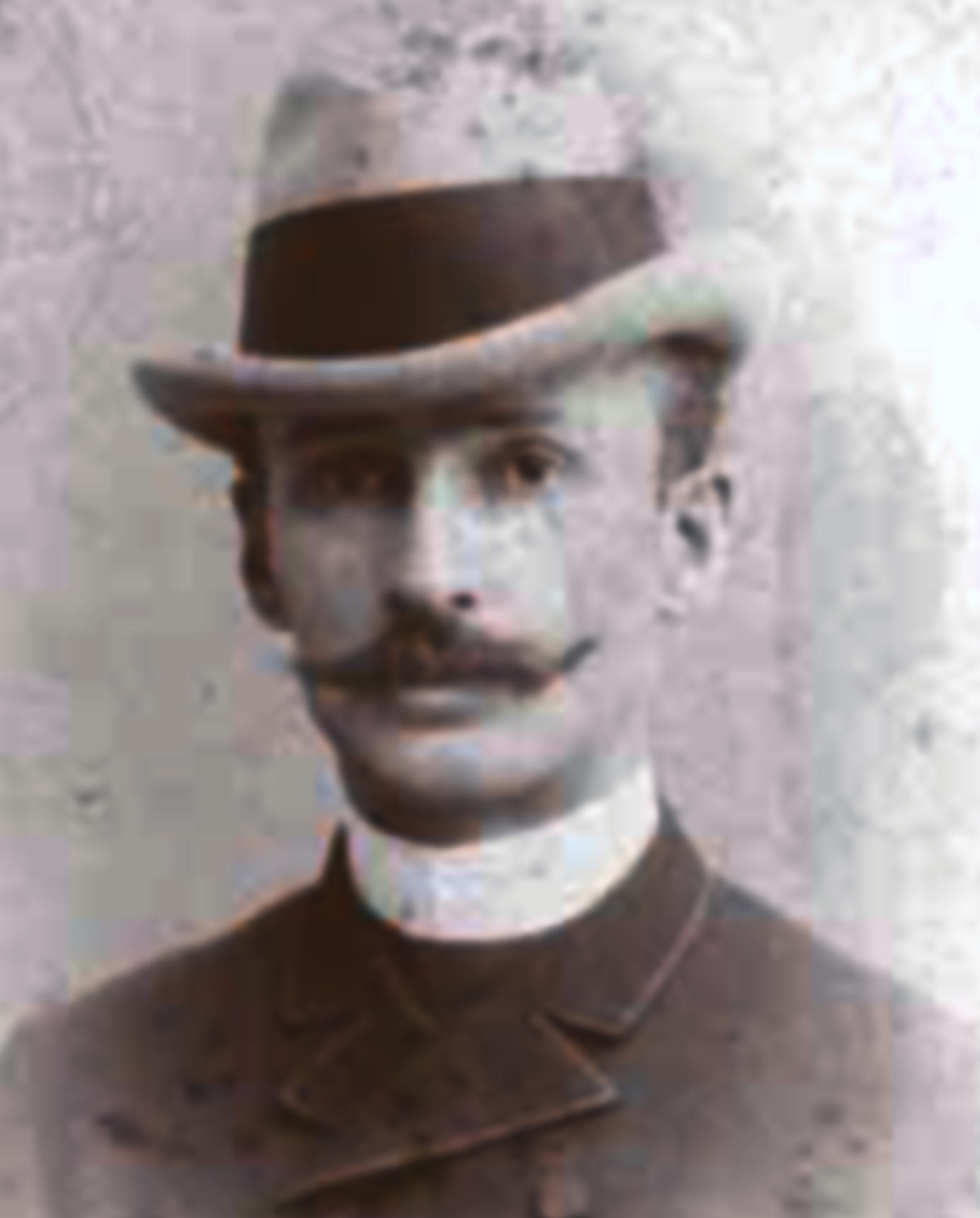
- Born: 12 March 1863; Bucharest
- Died: April 4, 1890; Madrid, Kingdom of Spain
- Title(s): aspiring Domnitor
- Royal House: Cuza
- Father: Alexandru Ioan Cuza
- Mother: Maria Catargi-Obrenović (officially, Elena Rosetti-Cuza)
- Spouse: Maria Moruzi

Alexandru Al. Ioan Cuza (also known as Alexandru A. Cuza, A. A. Cuza, or Sașa Cuza; 1862 or 1864 – April 4, 1890) was a Romanian aristocrat and politician. He was the eldest of the sons adopted by Domnitor Alexandru Ioan Cuza and his consort, Elena Rosetti-Cuza. Public opinion and historians generally agree that both Cuza brothers were Cuza's natural sons from his mistress Maria Catargi-Obrenović, though another hypothesis has them as born to Maria from her liaison with Cezar Librecht, the Postmaster General and spy chief. His biological and his adoptive mother both belonged to the boyar aristocracy of Moldavia. Through Catargi, Alexandru and Dimitrie were half-brothers of Milan I Obrenović, the King of Serbia, and of General Radu Catargi. During his brief political activity, Alexandru was repeatedly described as a Russophile or more specifically an agent of the Russian Empire, resembling in this Maria and her father, Costin Catargi.

Alexandru Ioan's reign marked the first political union between the two Danubian Principalities (Moldavia and Wallachia), which was to form the Kingdom of Romania in 1881. In the 1860s, his father made a conscious attempt at establishing a Cuza dynasty—this, together with his dissolute lifestyle, helped coalesce the "monstrous coalition", which fought to have him deposed. When Alexandru Ioan was ousted and replaced with Carol of Hohenzollern (February 1866), Alexandru Al. Ioan followed him into exile, graduating from the University of Paris. He settled back in Romania after his father's death, attempting to create a current of opinion against Carol, and being presented, by his partisans and adversaries alike, as a competitor for the throne. He rallied with the opposition Conservatives for the election of January 1888, winning a Third-College seat in the Assembly of Deputies, whereupon he resigned. In mid 1888, he helped journalists Alexandru Beldiman and Grigore Ventura found an anti-Carlist newspaper, Adevărul.

Alexandru stepped back from politics shortly after the peasant riots of 1888, having been identified as their inspiration, and possibly co-instigator. Also that year, when Dimitrie Cuza died, he was the last surviving direct male heir of the Cuzas, and the sole landowner of Ruginoasa. Gravely ill and allegedly incapable of fathering children of his own, he disinherited his adoptive mother, while favoring his young wife, Maria Moruzi. After his death in Madrid, the Cuza estate, including Ruginoasa manor, passed through his widow onto the Moruzis and the Brătianus. The dying out of the Cuza line remained contested into the 20th century, with inaccurate reports that "Cuza's son" was leading the peasants' revolt of March 1907, and with new claimants appearing in both France and Chile.

== Biography ==
=== Adoption scandal ===
According to most accounts, Sașa Cuza and his younger brother Dimitrie were born from a liaison between the Domnitor and his mistress Maria, the Moldavian boyaress, previously married into the House of Obrenović. Their maternal grandfather was Costin Catargi(u), a great landowner and Moldavian separatist, who had opposed Cuza's arrival to the throne in 1859. Through Maria, the two Cuza boys were also half-brothers of Milan, the future Serbian King, who was Maria's eldest son. On the Catargi side, their uncle Alexandru and cousin Alexis were noted career diplomats, while another uncle, George, was Domnitor Cuza's aide-de-camp.

Through Alexandru Ioan, Sașa descended from a matrimonial alliance of Moldavian boyars and Phanariotes. His paternal grandmother, Sultana Cozadini, was the niece of Moldavian Prince Nicholas Mavrogenes. The Cozadini family was an Italo–Greek branch of the Bolognese Gozzadinis—who had owned parts of Kea under the Duchy of the Archipelago, afterwards merging into the Phanariote community of Istanbul. Memoirist and social historian Radu Rosetti, who was also a relative of Cuza's wife Elena "Doamna", claims that there was no actual blood connection between Alexandru Ioan and his purported sons. He believes that their actual father was Maria's other lover—Cezar Librecht, the Belgian-born Postmaster General of Romania. By 1864, Librecht was presiding upon a quasi-legal secret service, which ran political errands for Cuza Sr.

Domnitor Cuza's legal marriage, meanwhile, produced no heirs. He and Elena were virtually separated by 1866, and, sources attest, were at best friendly to each other. Maria Obrenović was allegedly a Russophile, like her father, and rumors spread that, as part of this political intrigue, she intended to have Cuza divorce her rival. Instead, the boys were successively adopted by Elena: Alexandru on May 23 [O.S. May 11] 1865 (that is, shortly after the Domnitor had effected a coup, deposing his critics in Parliament), Dimitrie on November 17/5, 1865. As noted by scholar Mihaela Mudure, "Elena never complained about her husband's filandering, nor about her inability to birth a child, who would have consolidated her marital relationship with Alexandru Ioan Cuza. [...] She records the appearance of two children, born to her husband's mistress, as a normal occurrence. In the adoption papers, they are mentioned as 'bereft of parents'". Both boys were baptized Romanian Orthodox, having as their godfathers the Domnitor's associates, Librecht and Iordache Lambrino.

Their acceptance into the family came just as Cuza's authoritarian reign descended into administrative chaos, and as the monarch himself was calming his nervous states with alcohol and womanizing. The adoption act was especially alarming for the growing camp of anti-Cuzists, many of whom were dedicated supporters of rule by a foreign prince. As noted by scholar Frederick Kellogg: "On some Romanian palates, Cuza's amorous affair smacked of a scheme to establish a native dynasty with bastards as heirs to the crown." The fledgling Romanian state was still under tutelage by a consortium of European powers—of these, the Ottoman and Russian Empires strongly objected when the Domnitor issued documents formally addressing the newly adopted Sașa as Principe or Beizadea ("Prince"). Among those who suggest that Cuza intended to make Sașa his successor is researcher Alexandru Lapedatu, who also concluded that, at the time, Cuza was overreaching, isolated, "surrounded and adored by his favorites". According to historian Barbara Jelavich, while some in Cuza's party did look to Maria Obrenović's sons as the natural successors to the throne, "there was so much opposition to the idea of a native prince, as well as to Cuza himself, that this alternative had little chance of success." She continues: "By 1865 Cuza had won a formidable array of opponents on both the right and left."

Gender historian Nicoleta Roman uses the Cuza family as a study case of illegitimacy and adultery in the two principalities. She notes that the adoption was probably accepted by Elena after her husband's pressures. This is also reported by military historian Constantin Chiper, according to whom Elena Cuza was at first "revolted" by the monarch's requests, and remained "profoundly depressed" by his affair. The truth concerning Sașa's birth was a matter of public record, and a subject of great irritation for Elena's clan, the Rosettis. According to Roman: "Contemporaries knew about [the liaison] and did not refrain from condemning the great prince's immoral behavior, nor from turning the subject into a scandal where the mother was the main culprit." Nevertheless, both Alexandru and Dimitrie were still being introduced as orphans. In one such version of events, they were presented as Bucharest children, rescued from the 1864 flood. Cuza remained adamant that the boys had "no known parents"—this definition is preserved in his testament of January 1873, whereby Elena and the two male heirs are each granted a third of the Cuza family estate. The document nominated Metropolitan-Primate Calinic Miclescu and Efrem Ghermani as, respectively, caretaker of the estate and tutor of the Cuza boys.

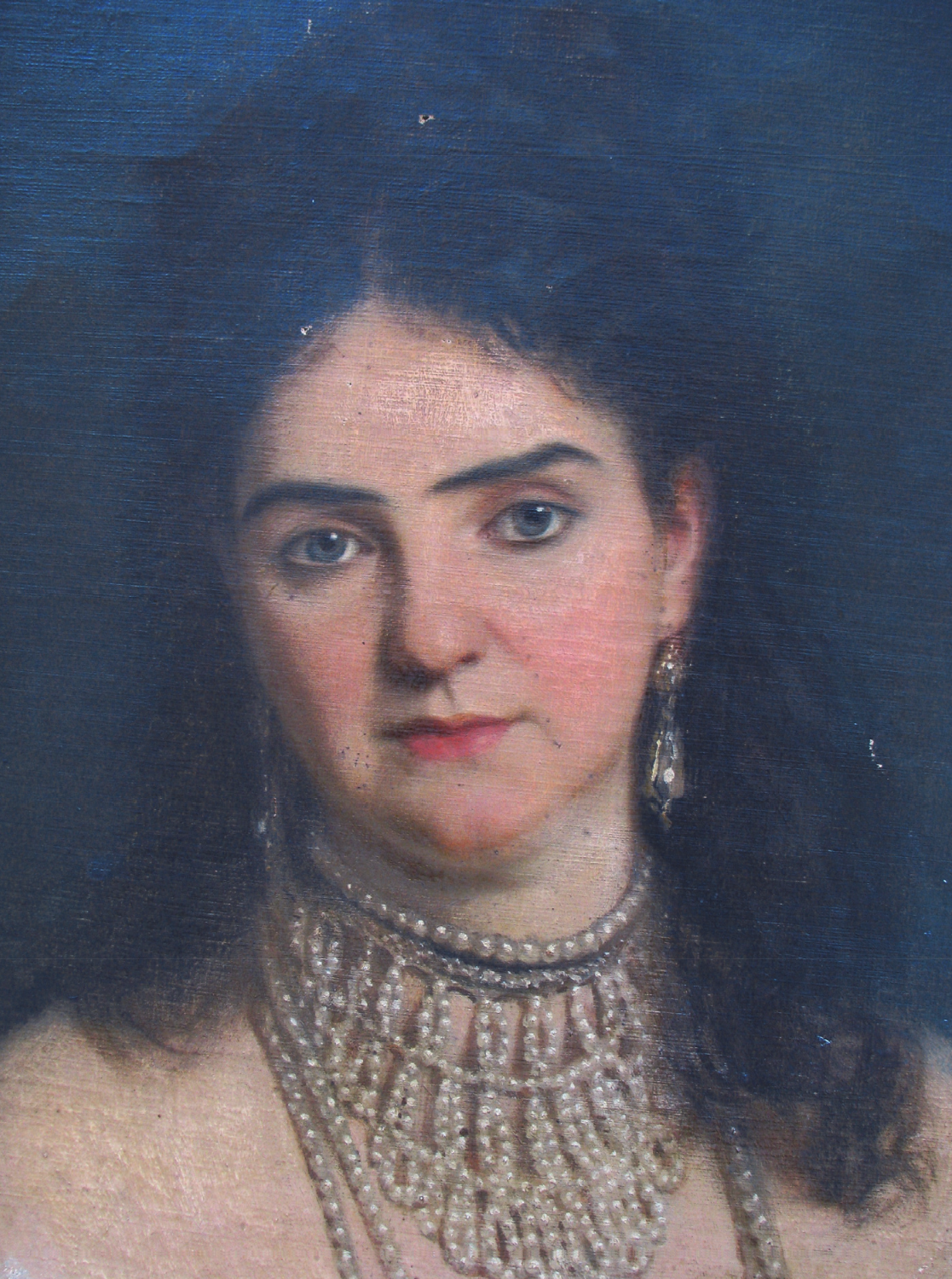
Maria Catargi-Obrenović ca. 1860, portrait by Michele Gordigiani

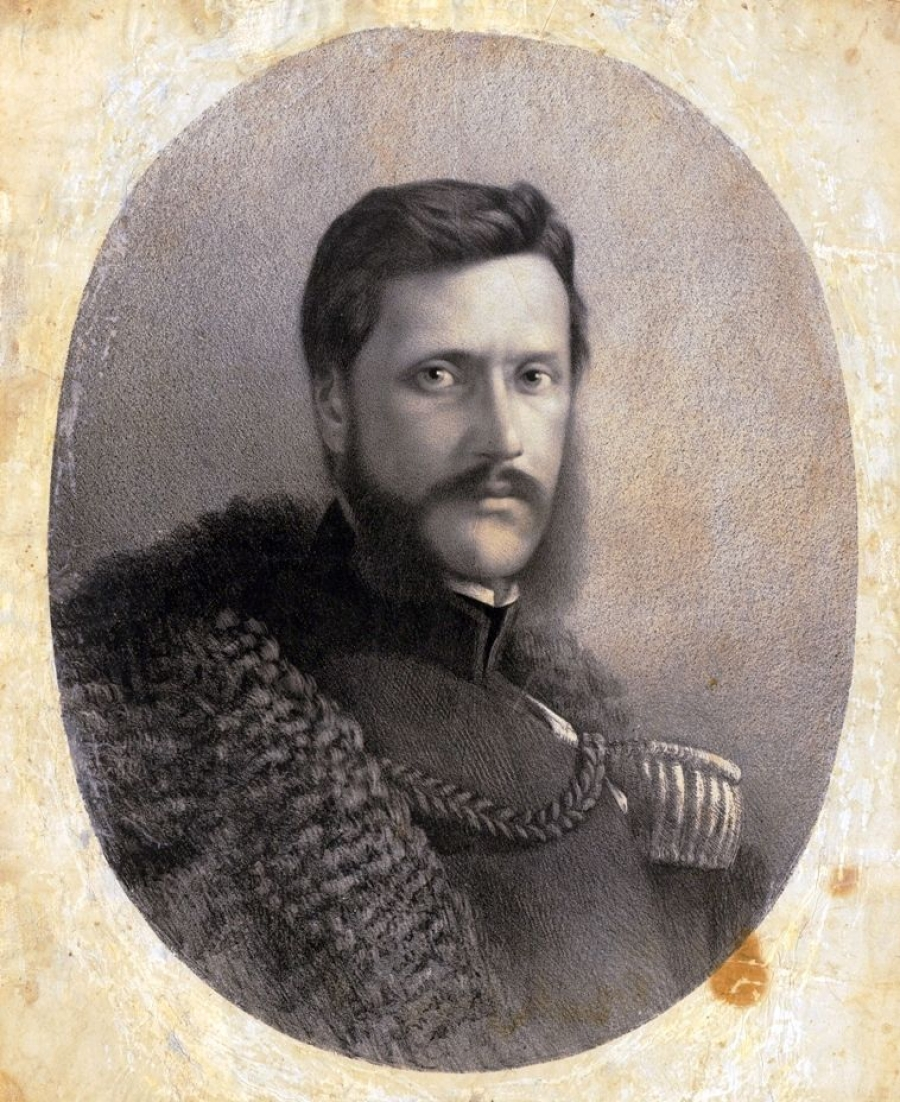
Alexandru Ioan Cuza in 1859, by C. I. Stăncescu

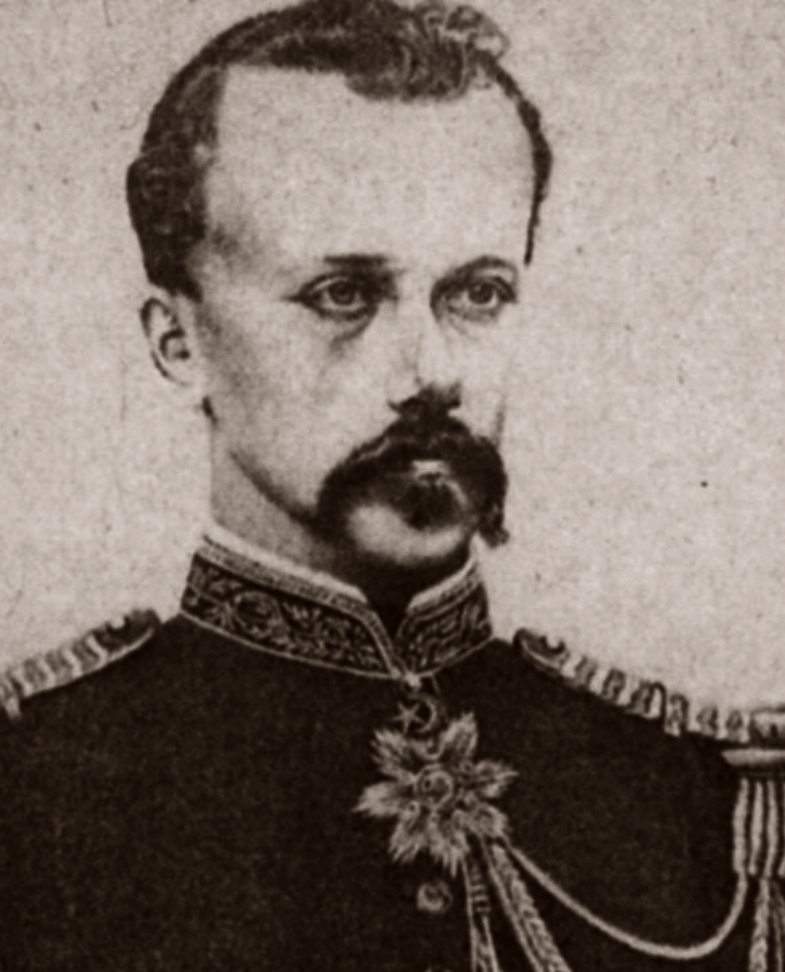
Cezar Librecht, by unsigned lithographer

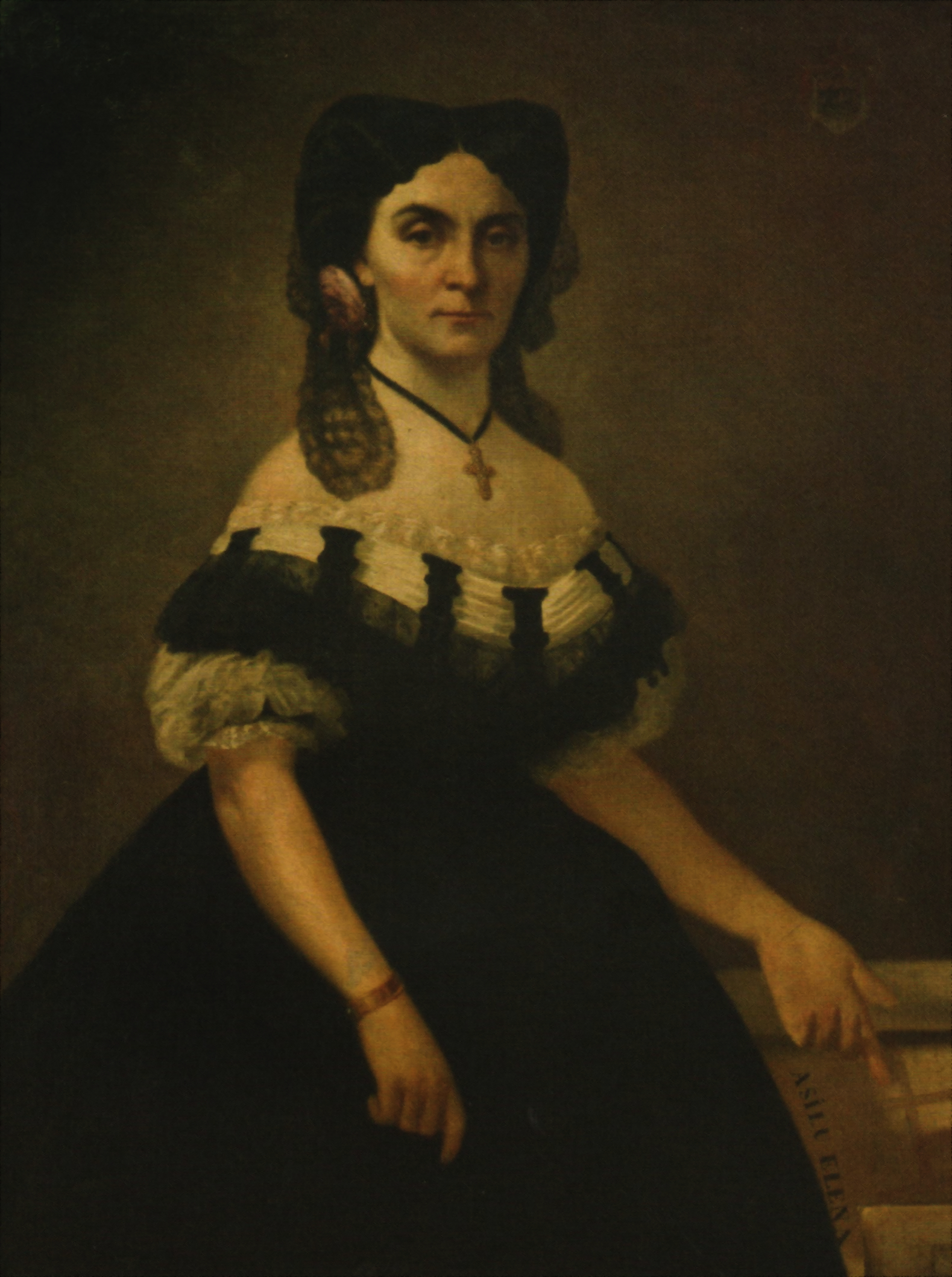
Elena Cuza in 1863, by Theodor Aman

=== Claimant ===
With Elena's acquiescence, Maria had been by Alexandru Ioan's side during much of his career, and was found with him when, in February 1866, a "monstrous coalition" conspiracy deposed and exiled Cuza. By contrast, George Catargi was involved in the conspiracy on its Masonic side, having joined the Wise Men of Heliopolis Lodge. During Cuza's arrest, the conspirators separated Cuza and Maria from Elena, who was left with the two boys. Seen as especially dangerous, Librecht was imprisoned by the 1st Chasseurs Battalion. He was subject to several quick trials over charges of embezzlement, and, though eventually acquitted, was asked to leave the country. In parallel, the deposed monarch was also pressured into exile. Elena decided to join him, even as the Rosettis (some of whom had participated in the coup), asked her to sue for a divorce.

The Cuzas moved periodically, from Austria-Hungary to the Kingdom of Italy, then to the German Empire, at Heidelberg. Later in 1866, Romanian representatives had selected Carol I as the Domnitor, and had agreed to a dynastic rule under his House of Hohenzollern. Although Cuza Sr was no longer welcomed in Romania, his wife and the two boys made occasional returns to their domain at Ruginoasa. In mid-1867, Carol visited Elena in Ruginoasa, reportedly informing her that he did not oppose Alexandru Ioan's return as a loyal subject. Maria Obrenović followed the Cuzas into exile, accompanied by her nephew Efrem Ghermani. In Vienna, she gave birth to another son, Radu. Purportedly fathered by a Russian officer (Konstantinovich), he was given the family name Catargi, and grew up to become a Romanian Land Forces general.

The former Domnitor died in May 1873 at Heidelberg, leaving his last will to be contested by a collateral Cuza line. Elena, Alexandru and Dimitrie moved to France, sharing their house with the Domnitor's former secretary, Frenchman Arthur Baligot de Beyne. In August of that year, French Prime Minister Albert de Broglie reported to his ambassadors that Carol was meeting the opposition of "extreme parties", and that "hostile newspapers have no shame in publicly advancing as a candidate one of Cuza's sons, for whom a Regency seems to have been already created." In 1875, a Bondrea Cuza and a Mrs. Figa opened a legal case against the adoption at the Suceava County court, and implied that they were going to expose Sașa and Dimitrie's true parentage; in the end, the plaintiffs failed to attend the procedures, and the case was annulled. Maria Obrenović spent her final years as a lady-in-waiting for Empress Augusta. In 1876, having been diagnosed with cancer, she committed suicide aged 41. Her belongings were left to Milan, Maria's legitimate son, who renounced all claims to them in 1879. During those years, her Obrenović son (married to the Romanian Natalia Keșco) had taken power in the Principality of Serbia, replacing his assassinated uncle Mihailo III; Milan himself ultimately abdicated in 1889.

During that interval, Carol successfully led a War of Independence against the Ottomans. Its diplomatic conclusion was helped along by Sașa's uncle, George Catargi, who persuaded Carol not to occupy the Vidin Eyalet, which was also claimed by Obrenović Serbia. Meanwhile, Elena Cuza continued to care for her husband's progeny, creating a family home for them at Ruginoasa, where they were often joined by her relatives, the Lambrino family. In the mid-1870s, the Cuza children again left Ruginoasa to pursue their studies abroad. Alexandru Al. Ioan himself graduated from the University of Paris Faculty of Law, and took some additional lectures in History. The Ruginoasa manor was again left unattended until 1879, when, as the new co-owner of the place, Alexandru took over the administrative chores. An inveterate card player, he gambled away much of its revenue. In 1885 and 1886, he traveled around the Carpathians with his nominal cousin Gheorghe Constantin Rosetti Solescu.

Alexandru Al. Ioan Cuza, obeying his adoptive mother's wish, eventually entered politics. A macaronic diary note by culture critic Titu Maiorescu reads: Der ältere Cuza-Sohn hat gărgăuni im Kopf seit er hier sein Freiwilligenjahr und viel mit Măria-Ta angeredet ("The older Cuza son has had a bee in his bonnet ever since he took here [in Romania] his one-year military service as a volunteer, and they often referred to him as Your Highness"). His younger brother, who suffered a debilitating disease of the lungs, was living in Paris, and showed no interest in politics. Alexandru's bid was in generating opposition against Carol (who was crowned King of Romania in 1881). As "Prince Cuza", Sașa participated in the election of January 1888, winning a seat in the Assembly, for Mehedinți County, Third College. He placed first after ballotage, having rallied with the opposition Conservatives. He soon after relinquished his seat. This decision is attributed by Chiper to political adversity: "the name he carried was a danger for his father's enemies who [...] launched on a furious campaign against his person".

In a letter he sent from Cannes on February 13, Cuza noted that he would have wanted to represent the peasantry and champion their cause, but that the Assembly Presidency was likely to be taken by one who had betrayed his father. On March 4, his election was ruled legitimate by the Assembly, though his resignation was also recorded. Deputy Mihail Kogălniceanu, who had been Alexandru Ioan's long-time political associate, welcomed Sașa's resignation as a wise gesture, which "has spared this Chamber much embarrassment." He also noted that it was natural for the peasant electorate to appreciate both Cuzas, since the Domnitor had "made them into landowners." A later assessment in O Século daily noted that the young Cuza was in fact below the legal age for holding political office, and that his letters, including one he sent to Kogălniceanu, simply illustrated his "wish to abstain."

In August 1888, Cuza financed Adevărul, an anti-Hohenzollern sheet that had first seen print in 1871. Published by Alexandru Beldiman and Grigore Ventura, it stated as its main goal the removal of the "foreign dynasty", demanding an elective monarchy and the universal male suffrage. Reputedly, Alexandru now considered himself a likely candidate to the position of elective monarch. The newspaper venture was reviewed with skepticism by those farther on the left, which identified Cuza as more directly involved in printing Adevărul. A notice in Le Parti Ouvrier, the French socialist paper, read: "The director of this rag is Alexandre Couza, son of the prince Couza, who was dethroned in 1866." It called Adevărul a "reactionary, Russophile" gazette. The Romanian republican publicist, George Panu, similarly alleged that Cuza intended to set up his own "camarilla" in lieu of Carol's, and also called out his and Beldiman's agenda as "Russian politics". In October, writer Jacques Saint-Cère depicted Sașa as the "accredited representative" of a "Russophile party", and a "docile organ of Russian influence."

=== Withdrawal and death ===
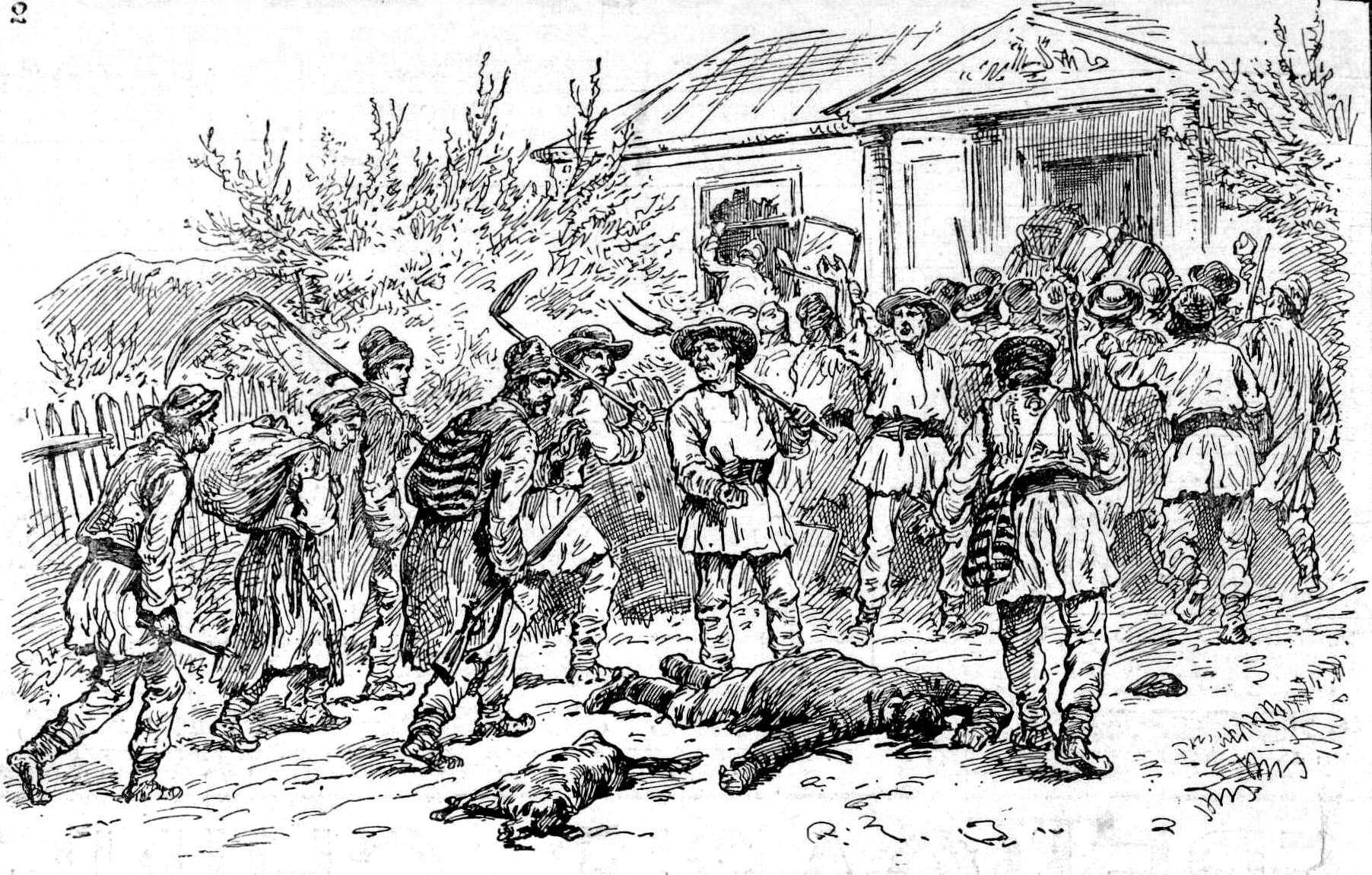
Raid on of a wealthy farmer's home during the 1888 riots, as published in The Illustrated London News, May 5, 1888

Later in 1888, a widespread anti-Carlist riot shook the Romanian countryside, and myths about Sașa's direct involvement began to spread. The rioters of Dâmbovița were persuaded that "sums of cash provided for by Cuza's boy" had been stolen by government officials. One peasant rebel, who escaped into the Principality of Bulgaria, spoke about a shady connection between the Cuzas, as proponents of deeper land reform, and Russian interests in Romania. He claimed that: "Cuza's son has visited the Tsar of Russia and the latter ordered him to write to all villages so that they should kill their boyars and demand their rights [...]. Russia's emperor [...] gave money to Cuza's son, who went and bought two storage rooms full of wheat in Călărași, that the inhabitants were supposed to divide among them, but the boyars hid [that wheat]." As noted by O Século, a "small group of those whom they call 'Cuzists'" was helping Alexandru to advance his vague claim to the throne; however, any proof as to whether he was actually involved in the incidents, if it existed, was made a state secret by the intervention of government officials. Beldiman, who was still Cuza's political associate, saw the rebellion as entirely instigated by the Russians.

Some time later, Sașa Cuza withdrew from public life, and settled in Ruginoasa. He had by become the only recognized male heir: also at Ruginoasa, Dimitrie had shot himself after an unhappy love affair. As the one surviving son, Alexandru enjoyed ownership over most of Ruginoasa and the traditional Cuza demesne of Barboși, essentially stripping Elena Cuza of her share in the Cuza estate. Shortly after Alexandru married fellow aristocrat Maria Moruzi (born 1863). The beautiful daughter of Alecu Moruzi and Adela (a Sturdza noblewoman), she was described by her contemporaries as a prototype of 19th-century Moldavian aristocracy. She drew his attention while they were both attending a party at Colonel Gheorghe Rosnovanu's place; their marriage was officiated at Ruginoasa on October 1, 1889, with Rosnovanu and his wife as the godparents.

Alexandru bequeathed to Maria his entire share in the Cuza estate. The decision was controversial, not least of all because Maria's ancestor, an 18th-century Moldavian Prince by the name of Constantine Mourousis, had put to death Sașa's own forebear, Ioniță Cuza. Some accounts suggest that Elena herself opposed the arrangement; she confided to her distant relative, A. C. Cuza, that she had "nothing against that marriage", though she was also "stunned" to find out that she had been disinherited. Already diagnosed with heart trouble, Alexandru fell ill with tuberculosis. According to some, his disease was a quickly progressing form, contracted during his wedding voyage. Others however note that both Alexandru and Dimitrie had suffered from "chest illness" for many years, and had taken little care of themselves. Journalist Lumința Duca-Sanda reads this as a reference to "the heart disease that had also struck down his father". A. C. Cuza provides additional detail, noting that the young pretender had a "chronic heart disease" and was sexually impotent.

The main Cuza line was abruptly ended when Alexandru Al. Ioan died, on the morning of April 4, 1890 [O. S. March 23]. Various sources note that this was six months into his marriage, occurring while the couple was visiting the Kingdom of Spain—more precisely, in Madrid. Madrid's correspondent for Le XIXe Siècle newspaper reported that, by March 30, the Prince was "in mortal danger", and that Elena Cuza was traveling there to see him a final time. She received the news of his death while still en route; the task of recovering his body fell on his brother-in-law, Sebastian Moruzi. His remains were transported back to Ruginoasa, and buried alongside the tombs of his father and brother. In the immediate aftermath, Elena asked to be handed her adoptive son's private papers, but Maria and Sebastian Moruzi refused to relinquish them: "[Maria] could not hand over Alexandru's documents without creating suspicion that she was only out to get his fortune."

== Posterity ==
As noted in 1938 by publicist Theodor Rășcanu (a distant relative of the figures involved), Sașa Cuza made little or no effort to provide for Elena Cuza, and never "returned in kind her mother's love". She was tolerated for a while on Ruginoasa premises, before Maria Moruzi-Cuza pressured her into leaving, and then took her to court over the validity of Alexandru's last will. The former consort of the Domnitor died in 1909, having spent her final years in Piatra Neamț town. Although the Cuzas' agnatic line was entirely extinguished with all collateral relatives dying childless, it was still invoked as a means to earn popularity within the anti-Carlist movement. In the 1890s, agitator Alexandru Bogdan-Pitești was passing himself off as Cuza's son, in what was probably a bid to earn the peasants' attention. During the rural insurgency of March 1907, some samples of black propaganda presented Crown Prince Ferdinand and "Cuza's son" as rebel sympathizers. In elections in November 1919 (the first ones to be held in Greater Romania and under universal male suffrage), A. C. Cuza ran as a Democratic Nationalist in Dorohoi County, and soundly defeated the Progressive Conservatives. As a partisan of the latter, Constantin A. Stoeanovici complained that: "[the Nationalists] presented themselves in elections by promising free land to the peasants, tax exemptions, and that their [...] candidates are descendants of Domnitor Cuza, who had given land to the peasants."

Another public scandal involving Maria Moruzi took place ca. 1897, when it became known that she was pursuing an affair with the young engineer Ion I. C. Brătianu (later a major political figure). This controversy had its own political connotations: Brătianu's father, Ion Brătianu, was a National Liberal representative in the 1866 conspiracy to topple Cuza. Rumors leaked to the press and the affair, together with the running Cuza–Moruzi lawsuit, created a sensation: Adevărul itself began referring to the estate as Rușinoasa ("Place of Shame"). The affair resulted in an unwanted pregnancy, and Maria was compelled to marry Brătianu. Their marriage broke local taboos: it lasted just one day, ending in as hasty a divorce. The couple's son was Gheorghe I. Brătianu, later a historian and politician, who lived at Ruginoasa until 1938. His mother shared ownership of the manor, and, in 1912, sold the corresponding property in Barboși to socialite Elena Volenti.

Maria Moruzi died in 1921, having by then served as president of the Romanian Red Cross. The Ruginoasa buildings, part of which had been donated to Elena Cuza's Caritatea Hospital, were heavily damaged during the World War II air raids on Romania. In 1945, financial pressures led Gheorghe Brătianu to sell the Ruginoasa domain, which eventually became an administrative complex of the Romanian Railways Company (CFR). Under communist rule, the state nationalized and retained it as cultural patrimony. During 2003, CFR unsuccessfully sued the Romanian state for damages. The claim to Cuza's inheritance had meanwhile been revived by other supposed male descendants. With a 1944 affidavit preserved in its 1994 photocopy, Frenchman Fabius Laiter claimed that he was the only surviving son of three children born to Dimitrie Cuza and Iliana Cojocariu. In the 1990s, a Chilean man, Abraham Orlando Decebal Cuza Hernández, publicized his claim to descent from the Domnitor, but failed to clarify which of the brothers was his ancestor. As of 2011, the last verified Cuza descendant was Dimitrie Callimachi, who inherits the claim from his ancestor Maria Cuza, sister of the Domnitor, but states that "the monarchy is an antiquated institution in Romania."
