= Marija Obrenović =

Romanian noble

Princess Marija Obrenović
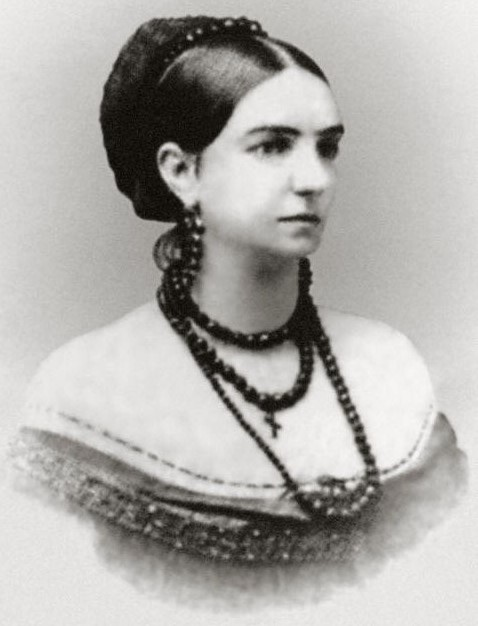
- Princess Marija, c. 1865
- Born: Elena Maria Catargiu; 1831; Iași, Moldavia
- Died: 16 July 1876 (aged 44–45); Dresden, German Empire
- Buried: Eternitatea cemetery
- Noble family: Catargiu
- Spouse: Miloš J. Obrenović
- Issue: Milan I of Serbia; Alexandru Al. Ioan Cuza; Dimitrie Cuza
- Father: Boyar Constantin Catargiu
- Mother: Smaragda Balș

Elena Maria Catargiu-Obrenović (Serbian Cyrillic: Елена Марија Катарџи-Обреновић; 1831 – 16 July 1876), known in Serbia as Marija Obrenović, was by birth a Moldavian and United Principalities boyaress.

== Early life ==
She was the daughter of Boyar Constantin Catargiu (1800–1871), a great landowner and Moldavian separatist and Romanian noblewoman Smaranda Balș (1811–1886), whose family dubiously claimed descent from the medieval House of Balšić.

== Biography ==
Maria's husband, Miloš J. Obrenović

Elena Maria married Miloš J. Obrenović, the son of Jevrem Obrenović and their son Milan was born in 1854.

In 1855, shortly after the birth of Milan, Maria and Miloš were divorced. In the early 1860s, she became the mistress of Domnitor Alexandru Ioan Cuza of Moldavia and Wallachia, and two sons Alexandru Al. Ioan Cuza and Dimitrie Cuza, were born out of their romance.

After Prince Michael III of Serbia was assassinated in 1868 without issue, Maria's son Milan ascended the throne as the new Prince of Serbia. Her younger son Dimitrie committed suicide in 1888 and Alexandru died the following year. After the fall of Cuza, his whole family was exiled, as was Elena Maria, who settled in Germany and became lady in waiting to Empress Augusta. In 1876, after finding out she had cancer, she committed suicide in Dresden and was buried in the Catargiu family mausoleum, Iasi.

== Issue ==
- King Milan I of Serbia (1854–1901)
- Alexandru Al. Ioan Cuza (born between 1862 and 1864, died 1889)
- Dimitrie Cuza (1865–1888)
