= Ionică Tăutu =

Moldavian craftsman (1798–1828)

Ionică Tăutu (usual rendition of Ion Tăutu; 1798–1828) was a Moldavian low-ranking boyar, Enlightenment-inspired pamphleteer, and craftsman ("an engineer by trade", according to Alecu Russo).

== Constitutional project ==
The last in a succession of boyars who advanced reforms during the Phanariote rule, Tăutu stood for the interests of a coalition of low-ranking nobility which aimed to protect itself against competition from modern developments, while adopting various liberal and Romanian nationalist principles in order to counter the growing political power of Moldavian princes. The entire group was referred to as cărvunari, an antiquated Romanian rendition of the Italian carbonari (although, unlike the latter, they were not organized as a secret society); the reference was to remain a denominator for radical groups in both Danubian Principalities (Moldavia and Wallachia) until the 1848 Wallachian revolution.

In 1822, under the rule of Ioan Sturdza (the first non-Phanariote prince in Moldavia), Ionică Tăutu advanced a thorough constitutional project, which soon became highly controversial. The new law proposed habeas corpus, free trade, as well as a radical definition of private ownership which denied confiscation under any circumstances; at the same time, it called for a reform of the traditional government by the prince and the estates of the realm (the Boyar Divan), which placed virtually all powers with the latter - thus attempting to preserve privileges obtained by boyars in the previous decades. Nevertheless, Tăutu was a cautious adversary of the French Revolution, which he likened to "the anarchy of crowds".

Given that high-ranking boyars had come to dominate the political landscape (and an inner-circle of families had effectively blocked several Phanariote reforms), Tăutu met stiff opposition from the political class: his reforms also attempted to increase representation for low-ranking boyars - a group otherwise threatened with extinction. The most noted adversary of his project was Mihail Sturdza (future prince), who rejected all decrease in influence for the high-ranking boyars. Ultimately, the Russian consulate in Iași, which had progressively gained influence in internal politics between the 1774 Treaty of Küçük Kaynarca and the Greek War of Independence, called for the initiative to be stopped, citing previous treaties between the Ottoman Empire (Moldavia's suzerain) and Russia, as well as the will of Emperor Alexander I of Russia.

Tăutu retreated from public life and died in self-exile in Istanbul.

== Legacy ==
His image was held in esteem by radical of later generations, and often offered as an example of nationalist revival. Alecu Russo, who wrote his memoirs in the 1850s, described Tăutu as "the revived Romanianness, carried along by all patriotic sentiments, and having the same role as the one Vladimirescu [the leader of the previous Wallachian uprising] had with a peasant rifle".

Giving evidence of an ultimately left-wing tradition emerging from low-ranking boyars (in his criticism of the conservative guidelines advocated by Junimea), the Poporanist Garabet Ibrăileanu postulated that Ionică Tăutu's was a "revolutionary class" and "the representative of all disinherited classes".
