= Stolnic =

Stolnic was a boier (Romanian nobility) rank and the position at the court in the Danubian Principalities of Moldavia and Wallachia. The title approximately corresponds to seneschal and is borrowed from the Slavic title stolnik (from the word stol, "table") a person in charge of the royal table.

The title mare stolnic means "great stolnic", or "Chief Seneschal".

The first documented usages of the title date to 1392 in Wallachia and 1393 in Moldavia.

== Notable stolnics ==
- Constantin Cantacuzino (cca. 1650–1716), stolnic, diplomat, historian and geographer.

== See also ==
- Stolnik, a noble rank in Poland, the Polish–Lithuanian Commonwealth, and Muscovy.
