= Rosetti family =

Moldavian boyar princely family

Ruset/Rosetti/Rossetti Full Achievement of Arms

The House of Rosetti (also spelled Ruset, Rosset, Rossetti) was a Moldavian boyar princely family of Byzantine and Italian (Genoese) origins. There are several branches of the family named after their estates: Roznovanu, Solescu, Bălănescu, Răducanu, Ciortescu, Tescanu, and Bibica. The Rosetti family in Wallachia is another branch of the family who initially settled in Moldavia.

== Notable members ==
List by birthday.

- Lascaris Rusetos (Rosetti; before 1580 - after 1646), father of Antonie, founder of the Moldavian branch of the family
- Antonie Ruset (Rosetti; c. 1615-1685), Prince of Moldavia
- Emanuel Giani Ruset (1715-1794), Prince of Wallachia and later of Moldavia
- C. A. Rosetti (1816-1885), Prince of Wallachia and later Romanian revolutionary, statesman, and writer
- Lascăr Rosetti (1816-1884), Prince and politician
- Maria Rosetti (née Marie Grant; 1819-1893), Princess, political activist, journalist, philanthropist and socialite
- Elena Cuza (née Rosetti-Solescu; 1825-1909), philanthropist; the Princess consort of the United Principalities and the wife of Prince Alexandru Ioan Cuza
- Nicolae Rosetti-Bălănescu (1827–1884), Prince, lawyer and politician
- Theodor Rosetti (1837-1923), Prince, writer, journalist and politician who served as Prime Minister of Romania
- Dimitrie R. Rosetti aka Dimitrie Rosetti-Max (1850-1934), Prince, politician, journalist, and playwright
- Radu D. Rosetti (1874-1964), Prince and poet
- Radu R. Rosetti (1877-1949), Prince, general and historian
- Maria Tescanu Rosetti (1879–1968), Princess and lady-in-waiting
- Elena Rosetti-Solescu (1889–1949), Princess, wife of field marshal of the 3rd Reich, Friedrich Paulus
- Alexandru Rosetti (1895-1990), Prince and linguist

== See also ==
- Roznovanu Palace
