= List of princes of Wallachia =

This is a list of princes of Wallachia, also known as the Voivodes of Wallachia from the first mentions of Vlach rulers situated in the Wallachian Plain in the mid-13th century until the union with Moldavia in 1859, which led to the establishment of Romania.

== Determining succession ==
Princes could be selected from various branches of a ruling family, and in some cases even from among a ruler's illegitimate sons. Such candidates were described as os de domn ("of voivode stock") or as possessing heregie ("heredity", from the Latin hereditas). The right to elect the ruler formally rested with assemblies dominated by the boyars, whose influence varied over time. This system was often contested by usurpers and was eventually replaced during the Phanariote era, when the Ottoman sultans directly appointed rulers. Between the Wallachian uprising in 1821 and Romania's independence in 1878, succession involved a mixture of election and appointment.

The rulers of Wallachia, like those of Moldavia, commonly bore the titles of Voivode ("duke") and/or Hospodar ("lord, master"). In Romanian usage, the term Domn (from Latin dominus) was most frequently employed.

== List of Wallachian princes ==
=== Prior to 14th-century ===
- Bezerenbam and Mișelav
- Seneslau
- John (knez)
- Farcaș
- Litovoi
- Bărbat
- Thocomerius

=== House of Basarab ===
From the early 15th century the family was divided in two main branches:

Dănești branch
Drăculești branch

Ruler	Portrait	Years	Marriage	Notes
Radu Negru		c. 1290 – 1310	Unknown	Radu Negru is the legendary founder of Wallachia; some historians consider him to be just a nickname of Thocomerius or Basarab I.
Basarab I the Founder (Basarab I Întemeietorul)		c. 1310 – 1352	Margareta two children	Son of Thocomerius; first non-legendary ruler of Wallachia.
Nicolae Alexandru		1352 – 16 November 1364	Maria Lackfy five children Clara Dobokai two children Margareta Dabkai no children	Son of Basarab I; from 1344 he was co-ruler with his father.
Vladislav I Vlaicu-Vodă		16 November 1364 – 1377	unknown	son of Nicolae Alexandru
Radu I		1377–1383	Anna one child Kalinikia c.1354 or 1355 two children	Son of Nicolae Alexandru.
Dan I		1383–1386	Maria of Serbia one child	Son of Radu I. After his death, his descendants formed the Danesti family.
Mircea I the Elder (Mircea I cel Bătrân)		23 September 1386 – May 1395 January 1397 – 31 January 1418	Maria Tolmay six children Anca no children	Son of Radu I. Wallachia reached one of its peaks. He was deposed by a usurper, Vlad, in 1395, but was restored in 1397.
Vlad I the Usurper (Vlad I Uzurpatorul)		May 1395 – January 1397	Unknown	Second son of Dan I, usurped the throne.
Mihail I		31 January 1418 – August 1420	unknown two children	Son of Mircea I, from 1415 he co-ruled with his father.
Radu II the Bald (Radu II Praznaglava)		August 1420 – October 1422 December 1426 – March/June 1427	unknown	War of succession in Wallachia, which opposed Radu II, brother of Mihail I, to the Danesti pretender Dan II (son of Dan I and member of the Order of the Dragon), where both had brief periods of power in succession.
Dan II the Brave (Dan II cel Viteaz)		October 1422 – December 1426 March/June 1427 – 1 June 1431	unknown five children	War of succession in Wallachia, which opposed Radu II, brother of Mihail I, to the Danesti pretender Dan II (son of Dan I and member of the Order of the Dragon), where both had brief periods of power in succession.
Alexandru I Aldea		1 June 1431 – December 1436	unknown	Son of Mircea I, ousted Dan II from the throne.
Vlad II the Dragon (Vlad II Dracul)		December 1436 – 1442 1443 – 7 December 1447	Unknown one child Cneajna of Moldavia three children	Illegitimate son of Mircea cel Bătrân; member of the Order of the Dragon (thus Dracul); While in negotiations outside Wallachia with the Ottoman Empire, his son Mircea was named prince. He returned to the throne in 1443, winning against John Hunyadi, and deposing also Basarab II. He was assassinated in 1447. His descendants, from his sobriquet, founded the Draculesti family.
Mircea II the Younger (Mircea al II-lea cel Tânăr)		September – December 1442	Unmarried	Son of Vlad II Dracul, sometimes not counted; he ruled while his father was absent, on his way to pay the tribute to the Ottoman Empire; Deposed by John Hunyadi. Returned in 1446, co-ruling with his father. He was blinded and buried alive by Hunyadi in 1447.
Basarab II		1442–1443	Maria (Dobra) two children	Son of Dan II; Placed in the throne by John Hunyadi, in war with Vlad II.
Vladislav II		7 December 1447 – 20 August 1456	Neacşa one child	Son of Dan II; supported by John Hunyadi, Regent of Hungary; The way he came to the throne is debatable, but the most accepted is that he killed Vlad II, and was then replaced in the throne by Hunyadi. Returned in 1448, after deposing Vlad the Impaler, and ruled again until his death in a combat hand-to-hand against Vlad III, who retook the throne
Vlad III the Impaler (Vlad Țepeș)		20 August 1456 – July 1462 June 1476 – January 1477	Unknown one child Justina Szilágyi; Between 1475 and 1476 no children	Son of Vlad II Dracul, invaded briefly Wallachia in 1448 (October–November) while Vladislav II was away. His real rule would begin after killing Vladislav II in battle. Vlad III was at war against the Ottomans.
Radu III the Fair (Radu cel Frumos)		August 1462 – November 1473 23 December 1473 – March 1474 March – bet. June/September 1474 October 1474 – January 1475	Maria Despina one child – Maria Voichița	Son of Vlad II Dracul; from 1473 in war with Basarab III.
Basarab III Laiotă the Old (Basarab Laiotă cel Bătrân)		November – 23 December 1473 March 1474 bet.June/September – October 1474 January1475 - June1476 January–December 1477	Unmarried	Son of Dan II; In war against Radu III.
Basarab IV The Young Impaler (Basarab IV Țepeluș cel Tânăr)		December 1477 – September 1481 November 1481 – 23 March 1482	Maria one child	Son of Basarab II. His first reign was briefly contested by: Mircea (II), an illegitimate son of Vlad II Dracul, supported by Stephen III of Moldavia from July to November 1480.
Vlad IV the Monk (Vlad Călugărul)		September – November 1481 23 March 1482 – November 1495	Rada Smaranda; Before 1460 four children Maria Palaiologina; 1487 one child	Son of Vlad II.
Radu IV the Great (Radu cel Mare)		November 1495 – 23 April 1508	Catherine of Zeta; 1494 four children	Son of Vlad IV.
Mihnea I the Bad (Mihnea cel Rău)		23 April 1508 – 29 October 1509	Smaranda no children Voica three children	Son of Vlad III. Abdicated to his son. Died 1510.
Mircea III the Dragon (Mircea III Dracul)		29 October 1509 – 26 January 1510	Maria of Serbia; 1519 two children	Son of Mihnea I.
Vlad V the Younger (Vlad cel Tânăr)		8 April 1510 – 23 January 1512	Anca of Zeta; Before 1508 one child	Son of Vlad IV; also known as Vlăduț
Neagoe Basarab		23 January 1512 – 15 September 1521	Milica of Serbia; 1505 six children	Possibly son of Pârvu Craiovescu (Craiovești family) or Basarab IV; The most accepted theory is that he claimed the throne as a son of Basarab IV, being in fact son of Pârvu. It's possible that the matter arose from the fact that Neagoe's mother was a mistress of Basarab IV. Cultural zenith in Wallachia.
Regency of Milica of Serbia (15 September – December 1521)				Under regency of his mother. His rule was briefly challenged by: (Vlad) Dragomir the Monk, possible son of Vlad the Younger who contested the throne in September–October of 1521.; Teodosie was defeated in 1521, fled with his mother, and died in exile the following year.
Teodosie		15 September – December 1521	Unmarried	Under regency of his mother. His rule was briefly challenged by: (Vlad) Dragomir the Monk, possible son of Vlad the Younger who contested the throne in September–October of 1521.; Teodosie was defeated in 1521, fled with his mother, and died in exile the following year.
Radu V of Afumati (Radu de la Afumati)		December 1521 – April 1523 19 January – June 1524 September 1524 – April 1525 August 1525 – 2 April 1529	Voica of Bucsani three children Ruxandra of Wallachia; After 1525 no children	Son of Radu IV; allied with the Craiovești.
Vladislav III		April – 8 November 1523 June – September 1524 19 April – August 1525	Unknown	Nephew of Vladislav II.
Radu VI Bădica		November 1523 – 19 January 1524	Unknown	Illegitimate son of Radu IV.
Basarab VI		6 January – 5 February 1529	Unknown	Non-dynastic; Son of Mehmed-bey.
Moise		January 1529 – June 1530	Unknown	Son of Vladislav III. Last of the Dănești. Deposed, died 29 August of that same year.
Vlad VI the Drowned (Vlad Înecatul)		June 1530 – September 1532	Anna of Moldavia; 1531 no children	Son of Vlad V.
Vlad VII Vintilă de la Slatina		September 1532 – 10 June 1535	Zamfira one child Rada one child	Illegitimate son of Radu IV.
Radu VII Paisie		10 June 1535 – 1545	Stana three children Ruxandra of Wallachia c.1541 three children	Son of Radu IV. Had to face some very brief boyar usurpations or mere attacks to his sovereignty: Barbu Craiovescu III (1535); Șerban din Izvorani (2 June – 15 July 1539); Laiotă Basarab (27 April – 2 June 1544)
Mircea IV the Shepherd (Mircea Ciobanul)		January 1545 – 16 November 1552 11 May 1553 – 28 February 1554 24 December 1557 – 25 September 1559	Chiajna of Moldavia; June 1546 seven children	Son of Radu IV.
Radu VIII Ilie the Cowherd (Radu Ilie Haidăul)		16 November 1552 – 11 May 1553	Unknown	Son of Radu V. Deposed; died 1558.
Pătrașcu the Good (Pătrașcu cel Bun)		28 February 1554 – 24 December 1557	Voica of Slatioare four children	Son of Radu VII.
Regency of Chiajna of Moldavia (25 September 1559–1564)				Son of Mircea IV. Deposed and died in exile in the following year.
Petru I the Younger (Petru cel Tânăr)		25 September 1559 – 8 June 1568	Jelena Crepovic of Transylvania; 22 August 1563 one child	Son of Mircea IV. Deposed and died in exile in the following year.
Alexandru II Mircea		8 June 1568 – 11 September 1577	Catherine Salvaresso; 1558; Pera one child	Son of Mircea III Dracul; popularly called Oaie Seacă (Barren Sheep). His rule was briefly challenged by: Vintilă, a son of Pătrașcu, usurped/contested the throne between March and June of 1574.
Regency of Catherine Salvaresso (11 September 1577 – July 1583)				Initially under regency of his mother, both were deposed by the usurper Petru Cercel. Mihnea paid for the assassination of his usurper, returned and ruled alone. In 1591, he was deposed and died in exile in Constantinople, in 1601.
Mihnea II the Turk (Mihnea Turcitul; Mehmet Bey)		11 September 1577 – July 1583 6 April 1585 – 19 May 1591	Neaga de Cislau; June 1582 three children	Initially under regency of his mother, both were deposed by the usurper Petru Cercel. Mihnea paid for the assassination of his usurper, returned and ruled alone. In 1591, he was deposed and died in exile in Constantinople, in 1601.
Petru II of the Earring (Petru Cercel)		July 1583 – 6 April 1585	Unmarried	Son of Pătrașcu; deposed Mihnea II, but ended up assassinated by his order.

=== House of Basarab, with interventions of Bogdan-Muşat and Movilești dynasties ===
Ruler	Portrait	Years	Family	Notes
Ștefan I Surdul (Stephen the Deaf)		1591–1592	Bogdan-Muşat	
Alexandru III cel Rău (Alexander III the Bad)		1592–1593	Bogdan-Muşat	also ruled Moldavia (1592)
Mihail II Viteazul (Michael II the Brave)		1593–1600	Drăculești	according to some, the illegitimate son of Petru Pătrașcu cel Bun; also ruled Transylvania (1599–1600) and Moldavia (1600), briefly bringing the three principalities under a personal union. Recognized the suzerainty of Prince Sigismund Báthory of Transylvania between 1595-1598, who then used the title Princeps Transylvanie, Valachiae Transalpinae et Moldaviae (Prince of Transylvania, Wallachia, and Moldova).
Nicolae Pătrașcu		1599–1600	Drăculești	Son of Michael II, co-ruled with his father since 1599.
Simion Movilă		1600–1601 1602	Movilești	
Radu IX Mihnea		1601–1602 1611 1611–1616 1620–1623	Drăculești	son of Minhea II Turcitul
Radu X Șerban		1602–1610 1611	Basarab	Nephew of Neagoe Basarab. 1st rule
Transylvanian occupation: direct rule of Gabriel Báthory (1611)
Gabriel Movilă		1616 1618–1620	Movilești	son of Simion Movilă
Alexandru IV Iliaș		1616–1618 1627–1629	Bogdan-Mușat	
Alexandru V Coconul (Alexander the Child-Prince)		1623–1627	Drăculești	son of Radu Mihnea
Leon Tomșa		1629–1632	Bogdan-Mușat	
Radu XI Iliaș		1632	Bogdan-Mușat	
Matei Basarab		1632–1654	Brâncovenești	
Constantin I Șerban		1654–1658	Basarab	illegitimate son of Radu Șerban
Mihnea III		1658–1659		

=== Pre-Phanariote period ===
The Ottoman influence in the Wallachian rulers' election grows from the mid-17th century onward. From 1659, the rulers elected are mostly scions of Greek families, and increasingly less linked to the original Wallachian ruling family. The process reached its peak with the called Phanariote period (1715–1821), where, between the rulers, there was already no connection (or a very distant one) with the dynasty of Basarab.

==== Various dynasties ====
Ruler	Portrait	Years	Family	Notes
Gheorghe Ghica		1659–1660	Ghica	
Grigore Ghica I		1660–1664 1672–1673	Ghica	
Radu Leon		1664–1669	Bogdan-Mușat	
Antonie Vodă din Popeşti		1669–1672	Popeşti	
Gheorghe Ducas		1673–1678	Ducas	
Șerban Cantacuzino		1678–1688	Cantacuzene	
Constantin Brâncoveanu		1688–1714	Brâncovenești	
Ștefan Cantacuzino		1714–1715	Cantacuzino	

=== Phanariotes (1715–1821) ===
Ruler	Portrait	Years	Family	Notes
Nicolae Mavrocordat		1715–1716 1719–1730	Mavrocordato	
Habsburg occupation (1716)
Ioan Mavrocordat		1716–1719	Mavrocordato	
Constantin Mavrocordat		1730 1731–1733 1735–1741 1744–1748 1756–1758 1761–1763	Mavrocordato	
Mihai Racoviță		1730–1731 1741–1744	Racoviță	1st rule
Grigore II Ghica		1733–1735 1748–1752	Ghica	
Matei Ghica		1752–1753	Ghica	
Constantin Racoviță		1753–1756 1763–1764	Racoviță	
Scarlat Ghica		1758–1761 1765–1766	Ghica	
Ștefan Racoviță		1764–1765	Racoviță	
Alexandru I Ghica		1766–1768	Ghica	
Russian occupation (1768)
Grigore III Ghica		1768–1769	Ghica	
Russian occupation (1769–1770)
Emanuel Giani Ruset		1770–1771	Rosetti	also called Manole or Manolache
Alexander Ypsilantis		1774–1782	Ypsilanti	1st rule
Nicolae Caragea		1782–1783	Caradja	
Mihai Suțu		1783–1786 1790–1793 1801–1802	Soutzos	
Nicolae Mavrogheni		1786–1789	Mavrogheni	
Habsburg occupation (1789–1790); Military commander: Prince Josias of Saxe-Coburg
Alexandru Moruzi		1793–1796 1799–1801	Mourousi	
Alexander Ypsilantis		1796–1797	Ypsilanti	2nd rule
Constantin Hangerli		1797–1799	Hangerli	
Alexandru Suțu		1802	Soutzos	
Constantin Ypsilanti		1802–1806	Ypsilanti	
Russian occupation (1806–1812)
Ioan Gheorghe Caragea		1812–1818	Caradja	
Caimacam; Grigore Brâncoveanu		1818	Craiovești	assisted by Vornic Barbu Văcărescu, Vistier Grigore Ghica and Logofăt Samurcaș
Alexandru Suțu		1818–1821	Soutzos	
Caimacam; Grigore Brâncoveanu		1821	Craiovești	
Tudor Vladimirescu		1821		leader of the anti-Phanariote uprising
Scarlat Callimachi		1821	Callimachi	

=== Post-Phanariote period ===
Ruler	Portrait	Years	Family	Notes
Grigore IV Ghica		1822–1828	Ghica	
Russian occupation (1828–1834); Military commanders: Fyodor Pahlen, Pyotr Zheltukhin, and Pavel Kiseleff
Organic Statute government (1832–1856)
Alexandru II Ghica		1834–1842	Ghica	
Gheorghe Bibescu		1842–1848	Craiovești / Brâncovenești / Știrbei / Bibescu	
Provisional Government		1848		Metropolitan Neofit II, assisted by Christian Tell, Ion Heliade Rădulescu, Ștefan Golescu, Gheorghe Magheru, Gheorghe Scurti
Locotenența domnească (Regency of three)		1848		Christian Tell, Ion Heliade Rădulescu, Nicolae Golescu
Joint Russian and Ottoman occupation (1848–1851); Military commanders: Omar Pasha and Alexander von Lüders
Caimacam; Constantin Cantacuzino		1848	Cantacuzino	
Barbu Știrbei		1848–1853 1854–1856	Știrbei	
Russian (1853–1854), Ottoman (1854) and Austrian occupations (1854–1856) military commander: Johann Coronini-Cronberg (1854–1856)
Protectorate established by the Treaty of Paris (1856–1859)
Caimacam; Alexandru II Ghica		1856–1858	Ghica	
Caimacam of three		1858–1859		Ioan Manu, Emanoil Băleanu, Ioan A. Filipescu
Alexander John Cuza		1859–1862	Cuza	also ruled Moldavia in personal union as the United Principalities of Moldavia and Wallachia.
Formal union of Moldavia and Wallachia in 1862 as the Romanian United Principalities. A new constitution came into effect in 1866 giving the country the official name Romania. For later rulers, see Domnitor and King of Romania.

== See also ==
- List of rulers of Moldavia

== Bibliography ==
- Constantin Rezachevici (2001). Cronologia critică a domnilor din Țara Românească și Moldova: a. 1324-1881. Editura Enciclopedică. ISBN 973-45-0386-3.
- Treptow, Kurt W. (2000). Vlad III Dracula: The Life and Times of the Historical Dracula. The Center of Romanian Studies. ISBN 973-98392-2-3.
