= Alexander Mavrocordatos =

Alexander Mavrokordatos, Mavrocordatos, or Mavrocordato (Greek: Αλέξανδρος Μαυροκορδάτος) can refer to:

- Alexander Mavrokordatos the Exaporite (died 1709), physician and Grand Dragoman of the Porte (1673–1709)
- Alexander Mavrocordatos Delibey (1742–1712), Prince of Moldavia (1782–1785)
- Alexander Mavrocordatos Firaris (1754–1819), Grand Dragoman of the Porte (1782–1785) and Prince of Moldavia (1785–1786)
- Alexandros Mavrokordatos (1791–1865), Greek diplomat and statesman, five-times prime minister of Greece
