= Alexandru Ghica (disambiguation) =

Alexandru Ghica may refer to:

- Alexandru Ghica, Prince of Wallachia (1766-1768)
- Alexandru II Ghica, Prince of Wallachia (1834-1842), later regent (1856-1858)
- Grigore Alexandru Ghica, Prince of Moldavia (1849-1853; 1854–1856)
- Alexandru Ghica (1903-1982, also spelled Alexandru Ghyka), legionary commander, General Director of State Security and Police (September 14, 1940 - February 3, 1941)
