= Emanuel Giani Ruset =

Prince of Wallachia
- Reign: May 1770 – October 1771
- Predecessor: Grigore III Ghica
- Successor: Alexander Ypsilantis

Prince of Moldavia
- Reign: 11 May 1788 – October 1788
- Predecessor: Alexander Ypsilantis
- Successor: Alexander Mourouzis
- Born: 1715; Istanbul
- Died: 8 March 1794 (aged 78–79); Kherson
- Religion: Orthodox

Emanuel or Manolache Giani Ruset (1715 – 8 March 1794) was a Prince of Wallachia (May 1770 – October 1771), and Prince of Moldavia (11 May 1788 – October 1788). He was a Phanariote and member of the Rosetti family.

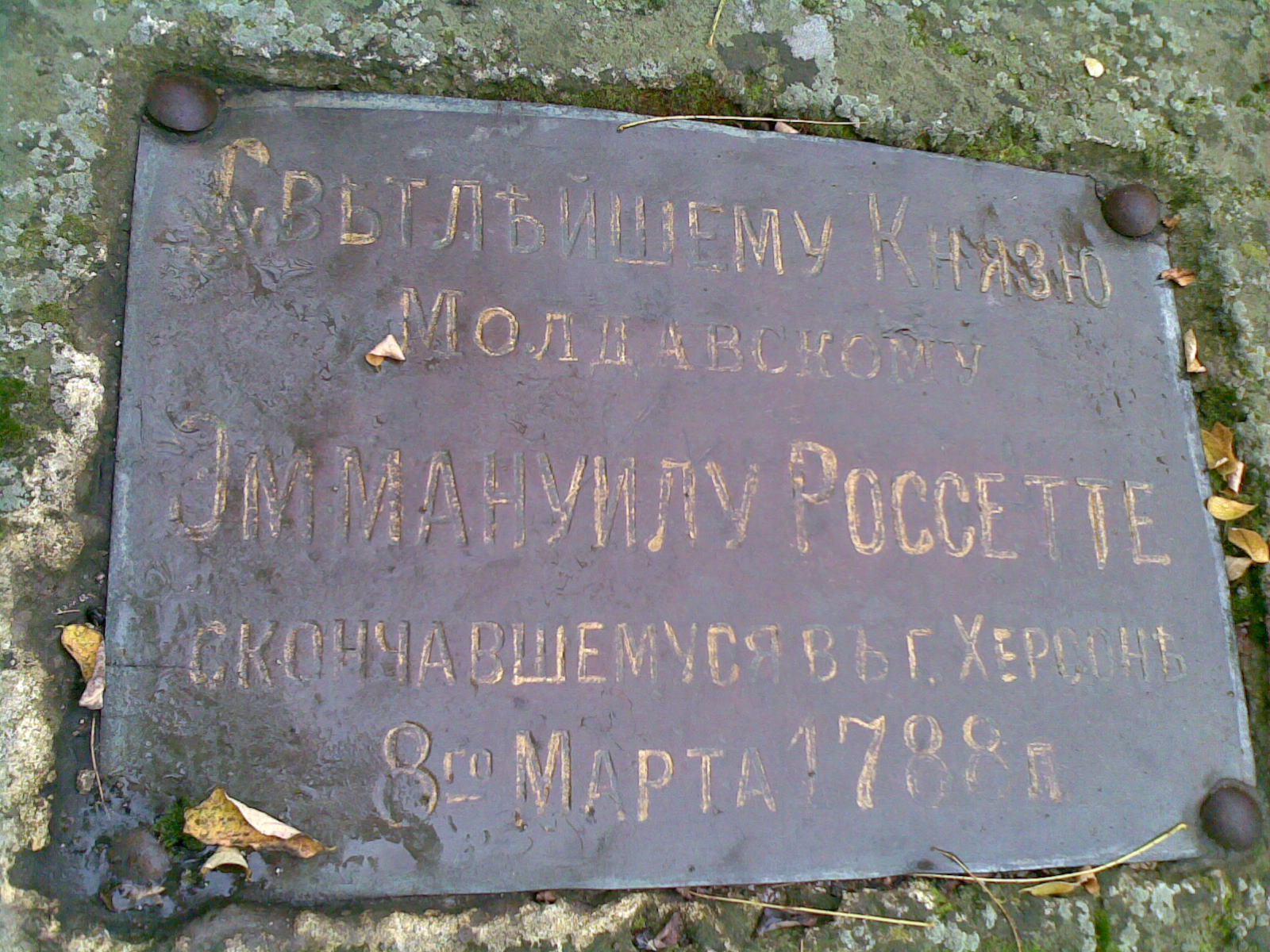
Burial place in Kherson city, Ukraine

== Life ==
Emanuel Giani Ruset is the son of a Greek pope named Ioannis, Giannis, or Tzanis and Euphrosine Ruset, great-granddaughter of Prince Antonie Ruset. The Italianization of the name seems to be a fantasy of a cleric in various documents; in any case, the phanariots, as dragogists (interpreter-translators of the "Sublime Porte") were all polyglots and sometimes Italianized or Frenchified their names.

He owes his ascension to the influence of his maternal family related to the Phanariot princes Mavrokordatos, Caradja, and Soutzos, and whose name, deemed prestigious, he associates with his.

Emanuel Giani Ruset had various functions, including Mare Spatar ("Minister of Defence", 1757) and Mare Postelnic ("Minister of the Interior and Justice") of Moldavia (1760). He was Prince of Wallachia from May 1770 to October 1771 during the Russian military rule of the country linked to the Russo-Turkish War of 1768–1774.

He was appointed Prince of Moldavia in May 1788 following the deposition of Alexander Ypsilántis. His second reign came to an end in March 1789, when Moldavia was occupied by Austro-Russian forces during the Austro-Russian-Turkish War (1787–1792).

He then retired to Chersonese in New Russia, where he died in 1794. He was then buried in the cathedral of Sainte-Catherine.

== Sources ==
- Alexandru Dimitrie Xenopol Histoire des Roumains de la Dacie trajane : Depuis les origines jusqu'à l'union des principautés. E Leroux Paris (1896)
- Nicolas Iorga Histoire des Roumains et de la romanité orientale. (1920)
- (in Romanian) Constantin C. Giurescu & Dinu C. Giurescu, Istoria Românilor Volume III (depuis 1606), Editura Științifică și Enciclopedică, București, 1977.
- Mihail Dimitri Sturdza, Dictionnaire historique et généalogique des grandes familles de Grèce, d'Albanie et de Constantinople, M.-D. Sturdza, Paris, chez l'auteur, 1983 ASIN B0000EA1ET.
- Jean-Michel Cantacuzène, Mille ans dans les Balkans, Éditions Christian, Paris, 1992. ISBN 2-86496-054-0
- Joëlle Dalegre Grecs et Ottomans 1453-1923. De la chute de Constantinople à la fin de l'Empire Ottoman, L'Harmattan Paris (2002) ISBN 2747521621.
- Jean Nouzille La Moldavie, Histoire tragique d'une région européenne, Ed. Bieler (2004), ISBN 2-9520012-1-9.
- Traian Sandu, Histoire de la Roumanie, Perrin (2008).

Preceded by Russian occupation	Prince of Wallachia; 1770–1771	Succeeded by Alexander Ypsilantis
Preceded by Austrian occupation	Prince of Moldavia; 1788	Succeeded by Russian occupation
