= Greek Genocide Memorial in Piraeus =

Sculpture beside Zea marina, Greece

Coordinates: 37.93416°N 23.65024°E

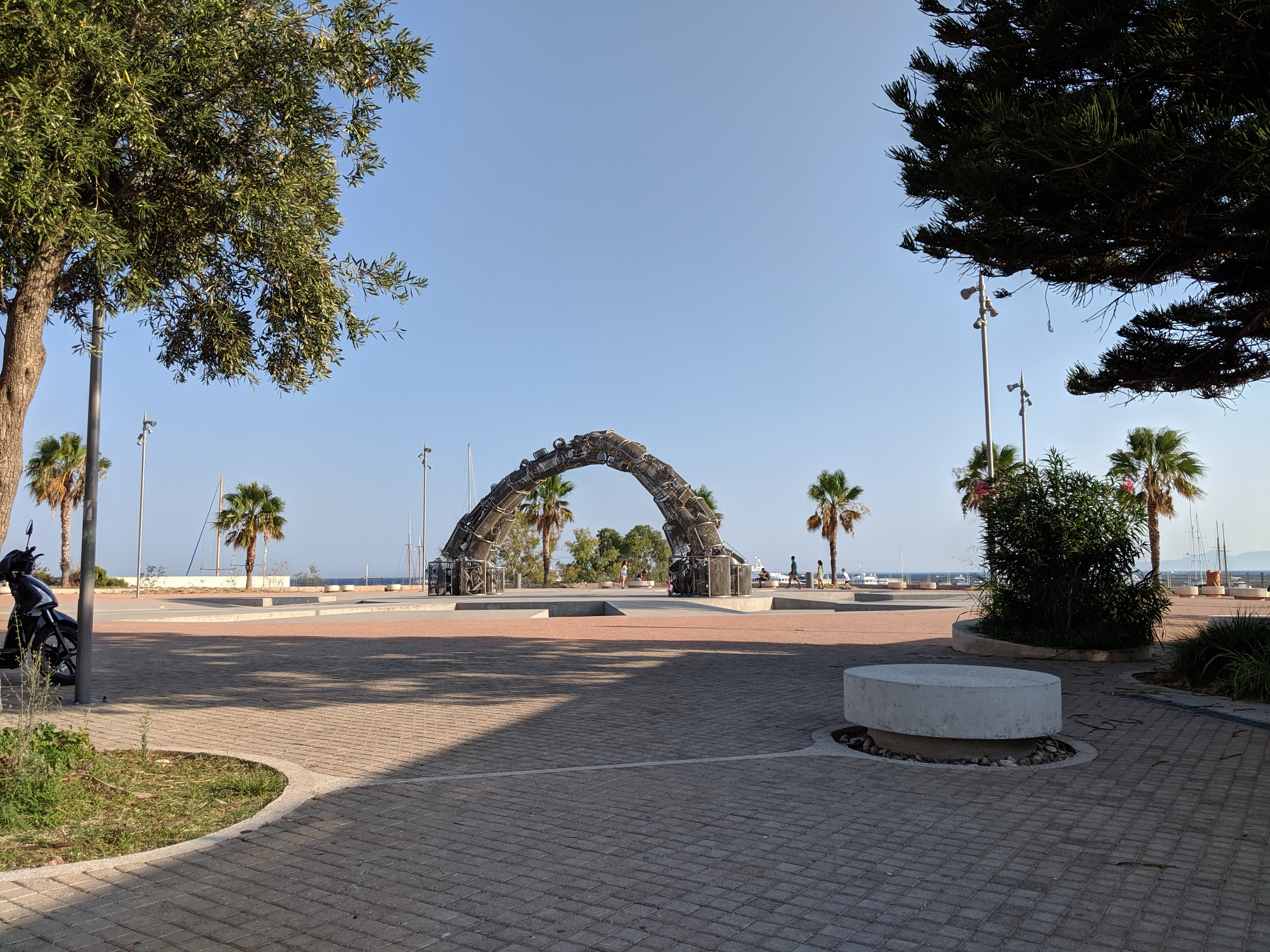

The Greek genocide Memorial in Piraeus is a major monument located in the Greek port city of Piraeus. It commemorates the genocide of the Pontic Greeks. The monument is situated in the Alexandra Square in Piraeus. The work consists of a contemporary sculpture created by artist Panagiotis Tanimanidis, who named it "Pyrrhic Flight." It was formally unveiled at a special ceremony in Piraeus on May 21, 2017. The ceremony marked the first time that memorial events to commemorate the genocide had taken place in Piraeus.

The monument was funded by businessman Evangelos Marinakis.

The Pontic Genocide was an atrocity carried out by the Turkish government, it was committed alongside the Armenian and Assyrian genocides. An estimated 353,000 Greek lives were lost as a result of the Pontic genocide.

Evangelos Marinakis has said that one of the reasons the monument was such an important project for him to contribute to, is because his mother, Irene Karakatsani, is a descendant of the Ypsilantis family, whose ancestors played a central role in the Greek War of Independence.

The three-dimensional sculpture is 15.50 metres long and 7.10 metres high. It is made of stainless steel and has brass details. Inside, the work is adorned with 17 sculptural compositions, successive icons depicting the flight from Pontus to reach an unprepared homeland that sheltered the refugees.
