= Ștefan Racoviță =

Prince of Wallachia (1713–1782)

Prince of Wallachia
- Reign: 8 February 1764 – 29 August 1765
- Predecessor: Constantin Racoviță
- Successor: Scarlat Ghica
- Born: 1713
- Died: 1782 (aged 68–69)
- House: Racoviță
- Father: Mihai Racoviță
- Religion: Orthodox

Ștefan Racoviță (1713 – 1782) was Prince of Wallachia, Romania, between 8 February 1764 and 29 August 1765.

Preceded by Constantin Racoviță	Prince of Wallachia; 1764–1765	Succeeded by Scarlat Ghica
