= Mihai Racoviță =

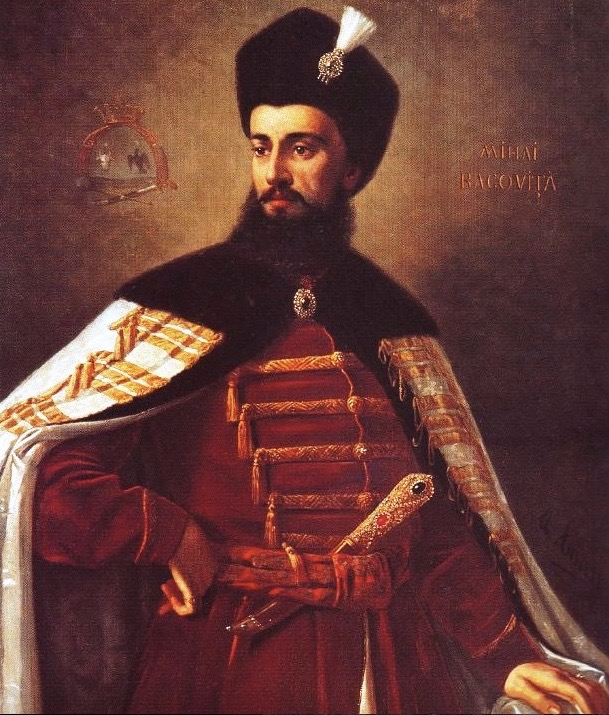
- Posthumous portrait by Theodor Aman, c. 1860–70

Prince of Moldavia (1st reign)
- Reign: September 1703 – 23 February 1705
- Predecessor: Constantine Ducas
- Successor: Antioh Cantemir

Prince of Moldavia (2nd reign)
- Reign: 31 July 1707 – 28 October 1709
- Predecessor: Antioh Cantemir
- Successor: Nicholas Mavrocordatos

Prince of Moldavia (3rd reign)
- Reign: 5 January 1716 – October 1726
- Predecessor: Nicholas Mavrocordatos
- Successor: Grigore II Ghica

Prince of Wallachia (1st reign)
- Reign: October 1730 – 2 October 1731
- Predecessor: Constantine Mavrocordatos
- Successor: Constantine Mavrocordatos

Prince of Wallachia (2nd reign)
- Reign: September 1741 – July 1744
- Predecessor: Constantine Mavrocordatos
- Successor: Constantine Mavrocordatos
- Born: c. 1660
- Died: July 1744; Istanbul
- Issue: Constantin Racoviță; Ștefan Racoviță
- House: Racoviță
- Religion: Orthodox

Mihai or Mihail Racoviță (c. 1660 – July 1744) was a Prince of Moldavia on three occasions (September 1703 – February 23, 1705; July 31, 1707 – October 28, 1709; January 5, 1716 – October 1726) and Prince of Wallachia on two occasions (between October 1730 and October 2, 1731, and from September 1741 until his death). His rules overlapped with the accession of Phanariotes in the Danubian Principalities – he is considered himself a Phanariote for the duration of his last rule in Moldavia and his rules over Wallachia.

In 1726, Racoviță presided on the trial of four Jews on charges of ritual murder of a child. The defendants were acquitted due to diplomatic protests by the Kingdom of France.

== Biography ==
=== First rules ===
A local boyar of the Racoviță House (and the father of Constantin Racoviță), closely related to the Cantacuzino family and the son-in-law of Constantin Cantemir, Mihai Racoviță was appointed ruler of Moldavia by Ahmed III, the Sultan of the Ottoman Empire, but had to continue fighting off other candidates for the throne, as well as their boyar supporters. To counter these, the Prince relied on Greek supporters: notably, his allies were the first members of the Rosetti family.

These conflicts brought an increase in taxation, as well as new fiscal demands. He was replaced by Antioh Cantemir, who, by contrast, was seen as an exceptional ruler. Again on the throne, Racoviță was deposed on orders from the Sultan, and recalled to Istanbul on pressures from Russia's Peter the Great; he was replaced by Nicholas Mavrocordatos.

He was returned to rule in Iași upon the outbreak of the Austro-Turkish War, given his image as an enemy of the Habsburg monarchy. When the Habsburg troops entered Moldavia, Racoviță suffered heavy losses, and called on the help of the Nogai Tatars in Yedisan. Subsequently, he was able to defeat the infiltrating forces at the Battle of Iași, and had the Habsburg commander executed together with those boyars who had risen against him.

=== Transylvanian campaign and late rules ===
He was ordered by the Ottomans to pass into Transylvania with Crimean Tatar assistance, where he was to help Francis II Rákóczi in his anti-Habsburg rebellion; his campaign met fierce Habsburg resistance in Bistrița, and his retreat was marked by another Habsburg invasion, as well as by the wide-scale plunder of boyar estates by the Nogais (allowed by Racoviță as payment for their participation in combat). After the incident, he was ousted from the Moldavian throne after his rival Mavrocordatos appealed to the Sultan, was jailed and replaced with Grigore II Ghica.

In 1726, Racoviță presided the Iași trial of four Jews from the Bessarabian borough of Onițcani, who stood accused of having ritually murdered a five-year-old child on Easter. The defendants were eventually acquitted following diplomatic protests (notably, the French ambassador to the Porte, Jean-Baptiste Louis Picon, remarked that such an accusation was no longer accepted in "civilized countries").

His ascension to the throne in Bucharest came in the context of Patrona Halil's Ottoman rebellion, which had toppled Ahmed III and brought Mahmud I as Sultan; Halil's downfall in the following year almost brought about Racoviță's, but he successfully furnished the Porte with income provided by raised taxes. He died in Istanbul.

== Notes ==
Preceded by Chancellor Ioan Buhuș	Prince/Voivode of Moldavia; 1703–1705	Succeeded by Antioh Cantemir
Preceded by Antioh Cantemir	Prince/Voivode of Moldavia; 1707–1709	Succeeded by Chancellor Ioan Buhuș
Preceded by Nicholas Mavrocordatos	Prince/Voivode of Moldavia; 1716–1726	Succeeded by Grigore II Ghica
Preceded by Constantine Mavrocordatos	Prince/Voivode of Wallachia; 1730–1731	Succeeded by Constantine Mavrocordatos
Preceded by Constantine Mavrocordatos	Prince/Voivode of Wallachia; 1741–1744	Succeeded by Constantine Mavrocordatos
