= John II Mavrocordatos =

Prince of Moldavia

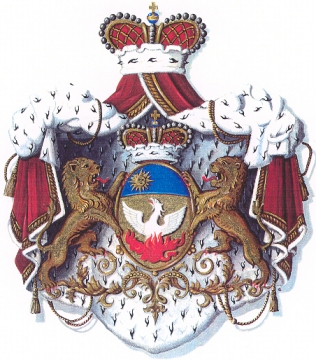
- Mavrocordat coat of arms

Prince of Moldavia
- Reign: 29 June 1743 – May 1747
- Predecessor: Constantine Mavrocordatos
- Successor: Grigore II Ghica
- Born: 12 March 1712; Istanbul
- Died: 29 July 1747 (aged 35); Istanbul
- Spouse: Maria Giuliano, Sultana Mano
- Issue: Alexander II Mavrocordatos
- Dynasty: Mavrocordatos
- Father: Nicholas Mavrocordatos
- Religion: Orthodox

John II Mavrocordatos (12 March 1712 – 29 July 1747) was a Phanariote who served as prince of Moldavia from 1743 to 1747.

== Life ==
Younger son of Nicholas Mavrocordatos, he remained in the shadow of his elder brother, Constantine. He replaced the latter in Moldavia on the occasion of one of his many changes of office as Hospodar of Moldavia from July 1743 to May 1747.

John II Mavrocordatos married successively Maria Giuliano and Sultana Mano, of whom he had:

- Alexander II Mavrocordatos, surnamed "Firaris" (1754–1819), Grand Dragoman of the Porte, then Hospodar of Moldavia and finally a Prince of the Russian Empire.

== Sources ==
- Alexandru Dimitrie Xenopol Histoire des Roumains de la Dacie trajane : Depuis les origines jusqu'à l'union des principautés. E Leroux Paris (1896).
- Alexandre A.C. Sturdza L'Europe Orientale et le rôle historique des Maurocordato (1660–1830) Librairie Plon Paris (1913) p. 130-221.
- Nicolas Iorga Histoire des Roumains et de la romanité orientale. (1920)
- (in Romanian) Constantin C. Giurescu & Dinu C. Giurescu, Istoria Românilor Volume III (depuis 1606), Editura Științifică și Enciclopedică, București, 1977.
- Mihail Dimitri Sturdza, Dictionnaire historique et généalogique des grandes familles de Grèce, d'Albanie et de Constantinople, M.-D. Sturdza, Paris, chez l'auteur, 1983 ASIN B0000EA1ET.
- Jean-Michel Cantacuzène, Mille ans dans les Balkans, Éditions Christian, Paris, 1992. ISBN 2-86496-054-0
- Gilles Veinstein, Les Ottomans et la mort (1996) ISBN 9004105050.
- Joëlle Dalegre Grecs et Ottomans 1453-1923. De la chute de Constantinople à la fin de l'Empire Ottoman, L'Harmattan Paris (2002) ISBN 2747521621.
- Jean Nouzille La Moldavie, Histoire tragique d'une région européenne, Ed. Bieler (2004), ISBN 2-9520012-1-9.
- Traian Sandu, Histoire de la Roumanie, Perrin (2008).

Preceded by Constantine Mavrocordatos	Prince of Moldavia; 1743–1747	Succeeded by Grigore II Ghica
