= Alexander Mavrocordatos Delibey =

Prince of Moldavia

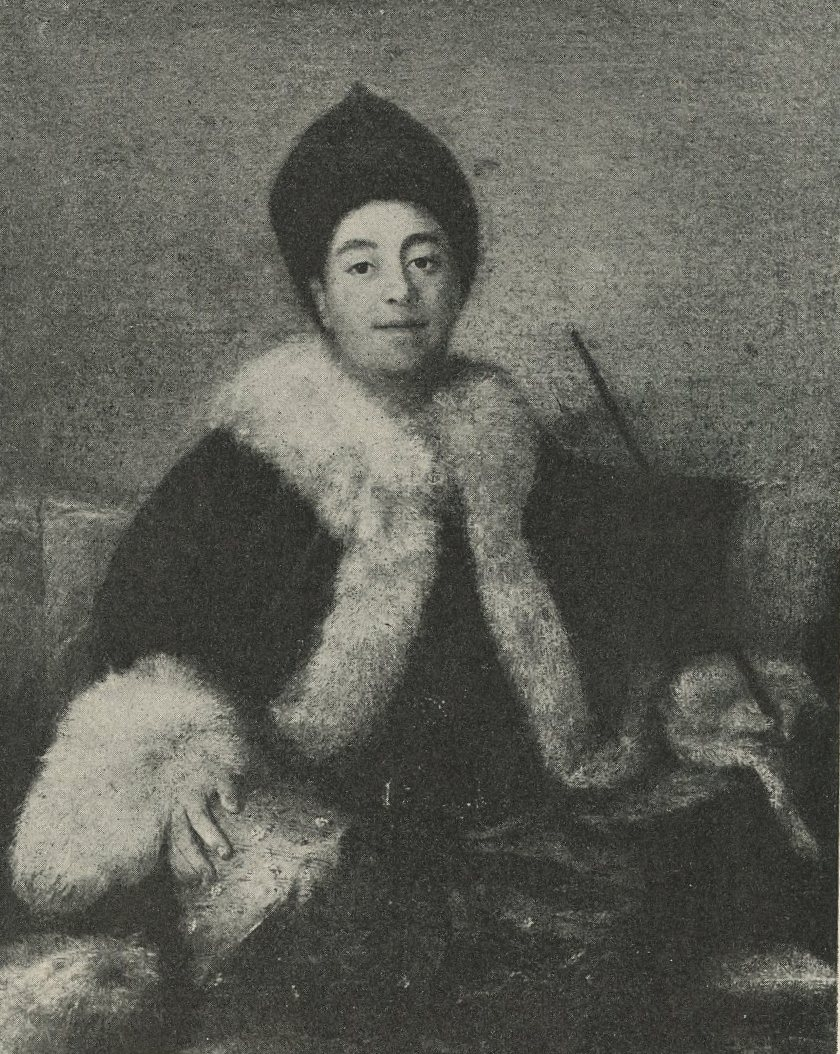

Prince of Moldavia
- Reign: 8 June 1782 – 12 January 1785
- Predecessor: Constantine Mourouzis
- Successor: Alexander Mavrocordatos Firaris
- Born: 1742; Istanbul
- Died: 27 March 1812 (aged 69–70)
- House: Mavrocordatos family
- Father: Constantine Mavrocordatos
- Religion: Orthodox

Alexander (I) Mavrocordatos (Greek: Αλέξανδρος Μαυροκορδάτος, Romanian: Alexandru I Mavrocordat; 1742 – 27 March 1812), nicknamed Delibey for his cunning, was a Phanariote who served as Prince of Moldavia from 1782 to 1785.

== Life ==
Son of Constantine Mavrocordatos and Catherine Rosetti, he succeeded in May 1782 to Constantine Mourouzis, deposed by the Sublime Porte following the intrigues of the Russian ambassador in Constantinople. He owes his appointment to this same ambassador.

Mavrocordatos was dismissed in January 1785 at the request of Rajtschewitsch, consul of Austria in Moldavia, who complained to the Ottoman government to have been badly received by Mavrocordatos, despite being the representative of the Holy Roman Emperor. But it is possible that in fact this is only one aspect of the Austro-Russian struggle for influence in Moldavia: the Habsburgs already had occupied Bukovina since 1775, and the Russian czars coveted the Budjak and the mouths of the Danube, and each Empire advanced its pawns in the region.

According to Alexandre A.C. Sturdza, Mavrocordatos was known for his "versatility and difficult character" which gave rise to his Turkish nickname "Delibey".

== Sources ==
- Alexandru Dimitrie Xenopol Histoire des Roumains de la Dacie trajane : Depuis les origines jusqu'à l'union des principautés. E Leroux Paris (1896).
- Alexandre A.C. Sturdza L'Europe Orientale et le rôle historique des Maurocordato (1660-1830) Librairie Plon Paris (1913), p. 243-245.
- Nicolas Iorga Histoire des Roumains et de la romanité orientale. (1920)
- (in Romanian) Constantin C. Giurescu & Dinu C. Giurescu, Istoria Românilor Volume III (depuis 1606), Editura Științifică și Enciclopedică, București, 1977.
- Mihail Dimitri Sturdza, Dictionnaire historique et généalogique des grandes familles de Grèce, d'Albanie et de Constantinople, M.-D. Sturdza, Paris, chez l'auteur, 1983 ASIN B0000EA1ET.
- Jean-Michel Cantacuzène, Mille ans dans les Balkans, Éditions Christian, Paris, 1992. ISBN 2-86496-054-0
- Gilles Veinstein, Les Ottomans et la mort (1996) ISBN 9004105050.
- Joëlle Dalegre Grecs et Ottomans 1453-1923. De la chute de Constantinople à la fin de l'Empire ottoman, Éditions L'Harmattan Paris (2002) ISBN 2747521621.
- Jean Nouzille La Moldavie, Histoire tragique d'une région européenne, Ed. Bieler (2004), ISBN 2-9520012-1-9.
- Traian Sandu, Histoire de la Roumanie, Éditions Perrin (2008).

Preceded by Constantine Mourouzis	Prince of Moldavia; 1782–1785	Succeeded by Alexander II Mavrocordatos (Firaris)
