= Racoviță =

Racoviță arms

The House of Racoviță (anglicized Racovitza) was a family of Moldavian and Wallachian boyars which gave the Danubian Principalities several hospodars, becoming influential within the Ottoman Empire and the Phanariote kinship network.

== History ==
Their ancestors became boyars under Alexandru Lăpușneanu (r. 1552–61; 1564–68). A member of the family was mentioned in a chrysobull dated 7 October 1487. The name is Slavic (Rakovica, meaning "crab"). The family was partially Hellenized. One of its branches remained present inside Romania. By the 17th century, the family was one of the leading families in the region. It later managed to penetrate into the Phanariote nucleus in Constantinople, which facilitated and increased their chances to occupy the thrones in their native country, and later to successfully maintain their positions. It remained influential in the Kingdom of Romania.

== Notable members ==
- Mihai Racoviță (c. 1660–1744), Prince of Moldavia and Wallachia
- Constantin Racoviță (1699–1764), Prince of Moldavia and Wallachia
- Ștefan Racoviță (1713–1782), Prince of Wallachia
- Nicolae Gr. Racoviță (1835–1894), Romanian politician
- Emil Racoviță (1868–1947), Romanian biologist, zoologist, and explorer
- Mihail Racoviță-Cehanu (1868–1954), Romanian general
- Ioan Mihail Racoviță (1889–1954), Romanian general in World War II
- Osvald Racoviță (1889–1954), Romanian politician, Mayor of Iași
- Aurel Racovitză (1890–1957), Romanian diplomat and general

== Sources ==
- Mihai Țipău (2004). Domnii fanarioți în Țările Române, 1711-1821: mică enciclopedie. Editura Omonia. ISBN 978-973-8319-17-2.
