= Scarlat Ghica =

Prince of Walachia

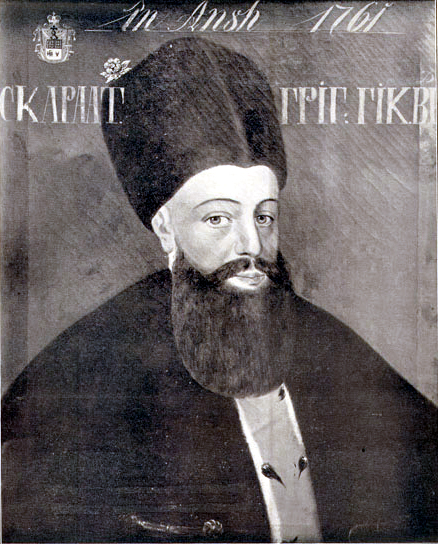
- Portrait by unknown, 1761

Prince of Moldavia
- Reign: 2 March 1757 – 7 August 1758
- Predecessor: Constantin Racoviță
- Successor: Ioan Teodor Callimachi

Prince of Wallachia (1st reign)
- Reign: August 1758 – 5 June 1761
- Predecessor: Constantine Mavrocordatos
- Successor: Constantine Mavrocordatos

Prince of Wallachia (2nd reign)
- Reign: 18 August 1765 – 2 December 1766
- Predecessor: Ștefan Racoviță
- Successor: Alexandru Ghica
- Born: 1715
- Died: 2 December 1766 (aged 50–51); Bucharest
- Burial: St. Spiridon Church
- House: Ghica family
- Religion: Orthodox

Scarlat Grigorie Ghica (1715 – 2 December 1766) was Prince of Moldavia (2 March 1757 – 7 August 1758) and twice Prince of Wallachia (August 1758 – 5 June 1761; 18 August 1765 – 2 December 1766). He belonged to the Ghica family.

He was the son of Grigore II Ghica and the brother of Matei Ghica.

He married three times. His first wife was Ecaterina, the daughter of Mihail Racovita voda; they had a son, Alexandru Ghica, who later became hospodar of Wallachia. His second marriage was to Eufrosina. His third wife was Ruxandra, daughter of George Muruzi and Casandra Ypsilanti. From this marriage, he had a daughter, Elena, who married Alexandru Callimachi, Prince of Moldavia. Their son was Scarlat Callimachi of Moldavia.

Preceded by Constantin Racoviță	Prince of Moldavia; 1757–1758	Succeeded by Ioan Teodor Callimachi
Preceded by Constantine Mavrocordatos	Prince of Wallachia; 1758–1761	Succeeded by Constantine Mavrocordatos
Preceded by Ștefan Racoviță	Prince of Wallachia; 1765–1766	Succeeded by Alexandru Ghica
