= Battle of Iași (1717) =

- Part of the Austro-Turkish War (1716–1718)
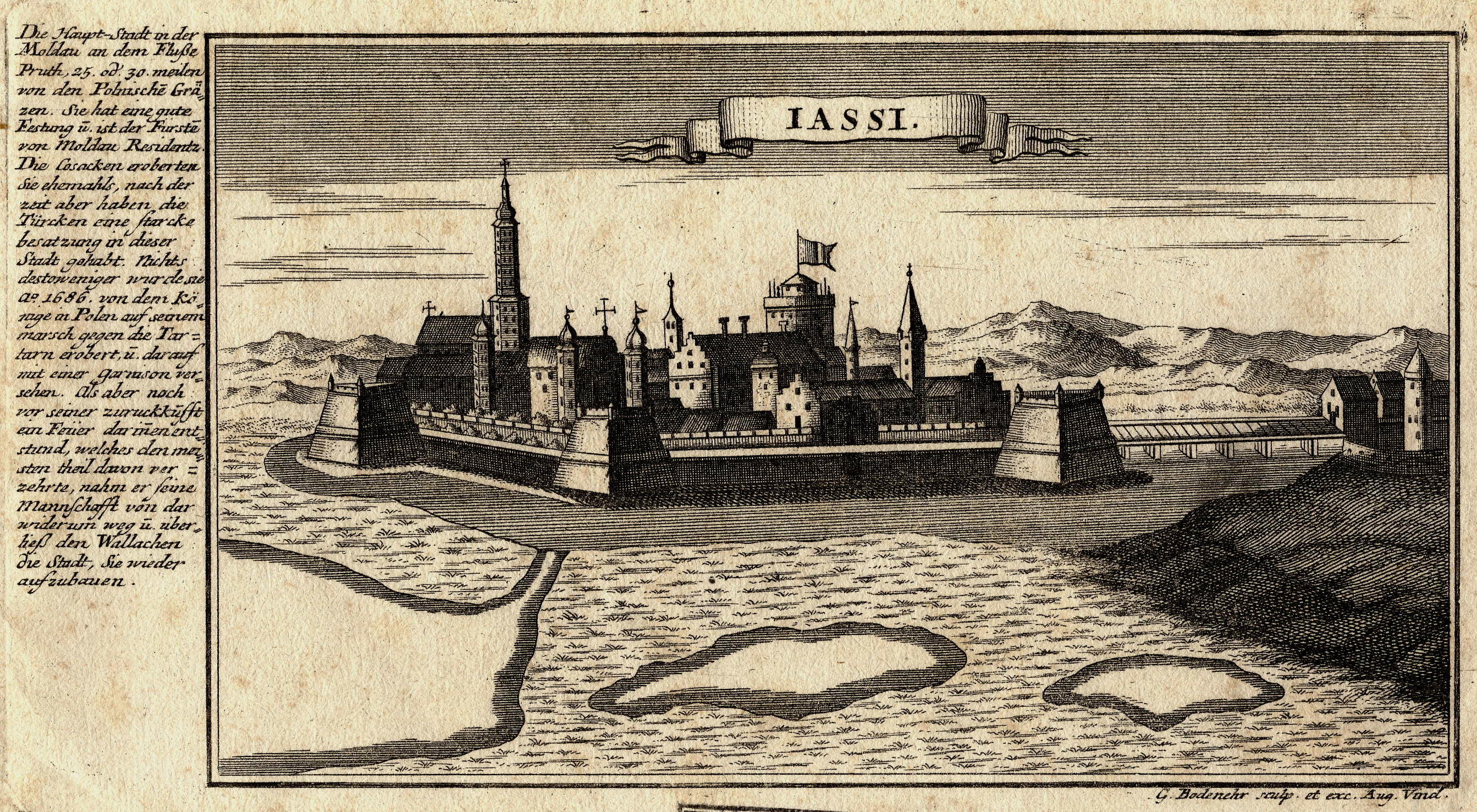
- Iași in late 17th century
Date	Early January 1717
Location	Iași, Moldavia (present-day Romania)
Result	Moldavian–Tatar victory

Belligerents
Habsburg monarchy	Moldavia; Crimean Khanate

Commanders and leaders
François de Lorraine †; Captain Ernau (executed)	(Moldavia) Mihai Racoviță

Strength
Unknown	(Moldavia) Unknown; 2,000–3,000

Casualties and losses
Almost all killed	Unknown

The Battle of Iași in 1717 was a military engagement between the Habsburgs and the Moldavian–Tatar forces. The Habsburgs invaded Iaşi but were repelled by a counterattack of Mihai Racoviță's forces.

== Background ==
Following the seizure of Temeşvar, Prince Eugene of Savoy gave General Count Steinville, who had returned to Transylvania, orders to invade Wallachia and Moldavia, declare them tributaries, and, if possible, remove the Ottoman influence from there. Mihai Racoviță was the voivode recognized by the Ottomans in Moldavia and Nicholas Mavrocordatos in Wallachia since the spring of 1716. However, they had so mistreated and exploited their subjects that the boyars were eager to get rid of them, which is why they made contact with the imperial commander in Transylvania.

The Imperial-Serbian forces raided Bucharest and managed to capture Nicholas Mavrocordatos. In February 1717, Nicholas signed a treaty ceding the western Wallachia region of Oltenia to the Imperials, and the remaining lands were to be neutral.

== Battle ==
After this success, Habsburg forces invaded Moldavia. Just like in Wallachia, there would now be an attack on the capital, Iaşi, and Mihai Racoviță would be overthrown. However, Racoviță was alerted and had already brought a force of 2,000–3,000 Tatars as a bodyguard. He himself had taken up a firm position in Catatsuja with his guards. The small Habsburg contingent that directly attacked Iasi in early January under Colonel François de Lorraine and Cavalry Captain Ernau met with determined resistance. Although Iași was suddenly raided and the fortress captured, the Habsburgs resorted to drinking when they were attacked by the Tatars and driven out of the city.

Their retreat began after a heavy battle that resulted in the Habsburgs complete defeat. They were massacred by the Tatars almost to the last man. Ernau was among the dead; François, alive, was captured by the Tatars and immediately executed. Racoviță dealt harshly to the boyars who collaborated, or were suspected of collaborating, with the Habsburgs.

== Aftermath ==
After this battle, Prince Eugene no longer had any intention of extending the Habsburg rule in this direction.

== Sources ==
- Johann Wilhelm Zinkeisen (2011), History of the Ottoman Empire, Vol V (In Turkish).
- József Bánlaky: Military history of the Hungarian nation (MEK-OSZK), 0014/1149. The Transylvanian Corps' operations in Wallachia and Moldavia.
- Brian Davies (2011), Empire and Military Revolution in Eastern Europe, Russia's Turkish Wars in the Eighteenth Century.
