= Friedrich von der Pahlen =

Aristocrat and diplomat

- Фёдор Петрович Пален

Personal details
- Born: September 2, 1780 Mitau, Polish–Lithuanian Commonwealth (now Jelgava, Latvia)
- Died: January 8, 1863 (aged 82) Saint Petersburg, Russian Empire

Friedrich Alexander Graf von der Pahlen (Russian: Фёдор Петрович Пален, romanized: Fyodor Petrovich Palen; September 2, 1780 – January 8, 1863) was a Baltic German diplomat and administrator.

== Biography ==
Friedrich was the youngest son of Peter Ludwig von der Pahlen, a prominent Russian courtier. He worked at Russian diplomatic missions in Sweden, France and Great Britain. In 1809–1811 he was Imperial Russia's Ambassador to the United States, in 1811–1815 he was the Ambassador to Brazil and in 1815–1822 he was the Ambassador to Bavaria.

Later, he became the General-Governor of Novorossiya and the namestnik (deputy) of Bessarabia (following the departure of Mikhail Semyonovich Vorontsov to the Caucasus). He was also a member of the State Council of Imperial Russia. In the context of the Russo-Turkish War of 1828–1829, Pahlen served as governor of the Danubian Principalities, which were administered by Russia pending the payment of war reparations by the Ottoman Empire (his official title was that of Plenipotentiary President of the Divans in Moldavia and Wallachia); he was replaced by Pyotr Zheltukhin on February 2, 1829.

In Jewish history, Pahlen is credited with opening of the first secular Jewish school in Odessa.
