= Church of the Prophet Samuel, Focșani =

Heritage site in Vrancea County, Romania

Coordinates: 45°42′15″N 27°11′08″E

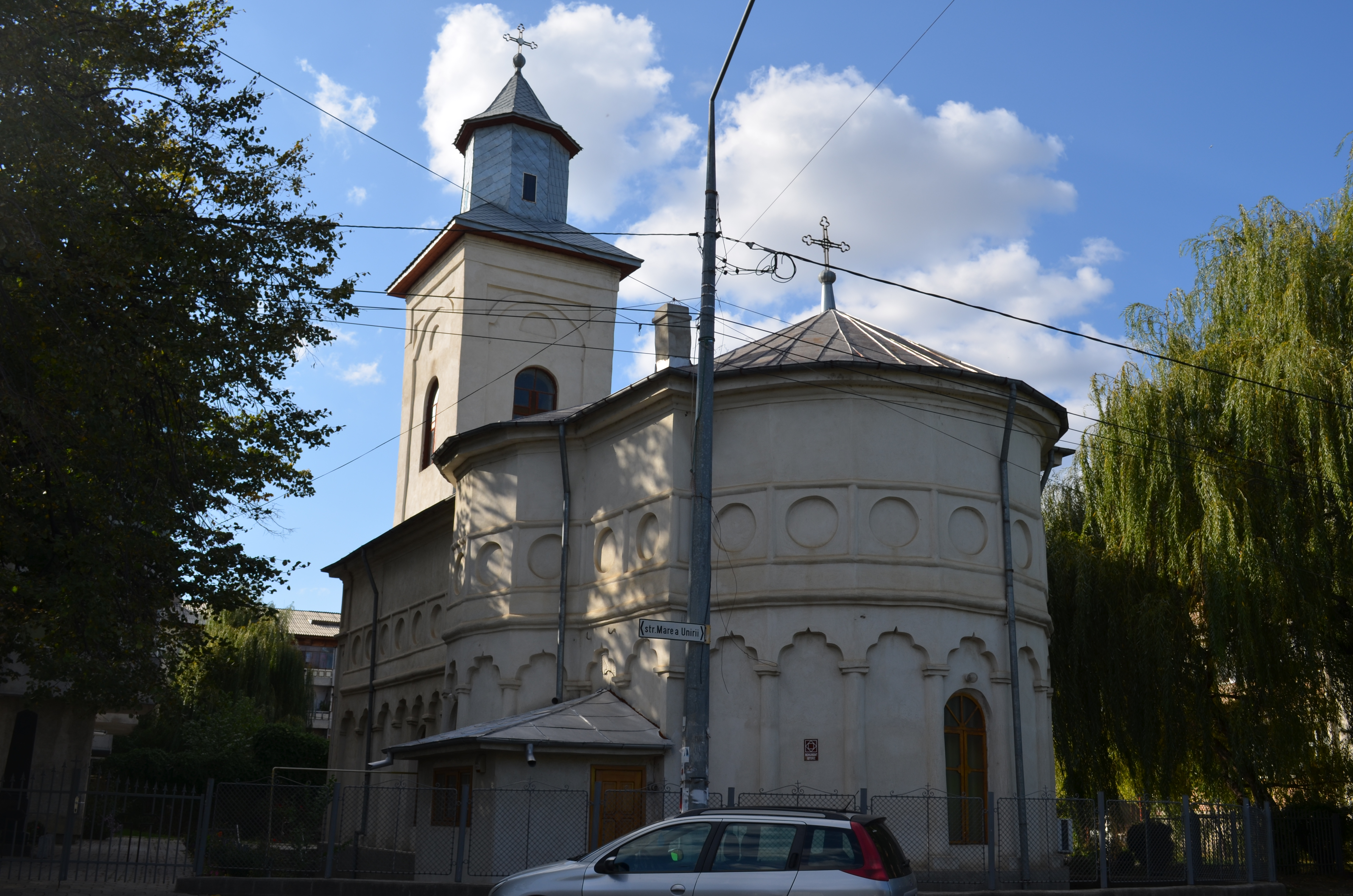
Church of the Prophet Samuel

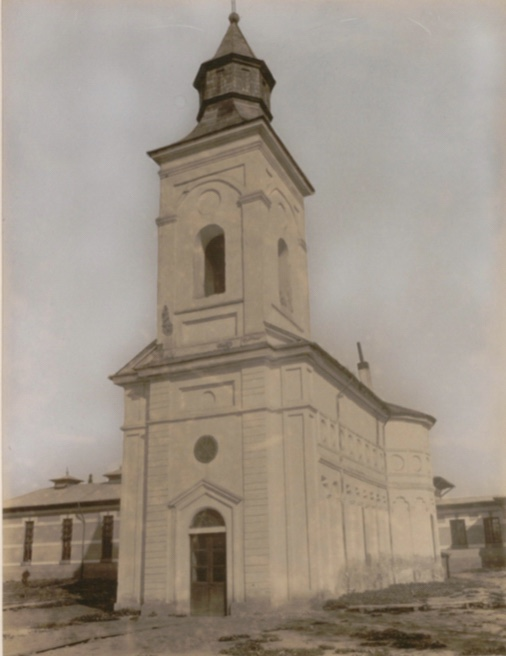
The church in 1893

The Church of the Prophet Samuel (Romanian: Biserica Proorocul Samuil) is a Romanian Orthodox church located at 28 Mare a Unirii Street in Focșani, Romania. It is dedicated to the Prophet Samuel.

The church ktetor was Constantin Racoviță, Prince of Moldavia; it was built in 1756 on land donated by a painter. The Chronicles of the Land of Moldavia mention an earlier wooden church on the site. The church gradually became part of a monastery complex, surrounded by a stone wall. In 1789, it offered shelter to Russian and Austrian troops during the Austro-Turkish War (1788–1791).

The cross-shaped church, in Wallachian style, has a porch, narthex, nave and altar. The square spire sits atop the porch. It is decorated with semicircular arches around its windows, and is accessed by a wooden staircase. The facades are divided into two registers by a row of stone. The lower section is decorated with three-lobed arches and columns. The upper features rectangular frames with circles inside. The door stands out in sharp relief.

The church and its wall are listed as historic monuments by Romania's Ministry of Culture and Religious Affairs.
