= Alexander Mavrocordatos Firaris =

Moldavian prince (r. 1785–1786)

Alexander Mavrocordatos
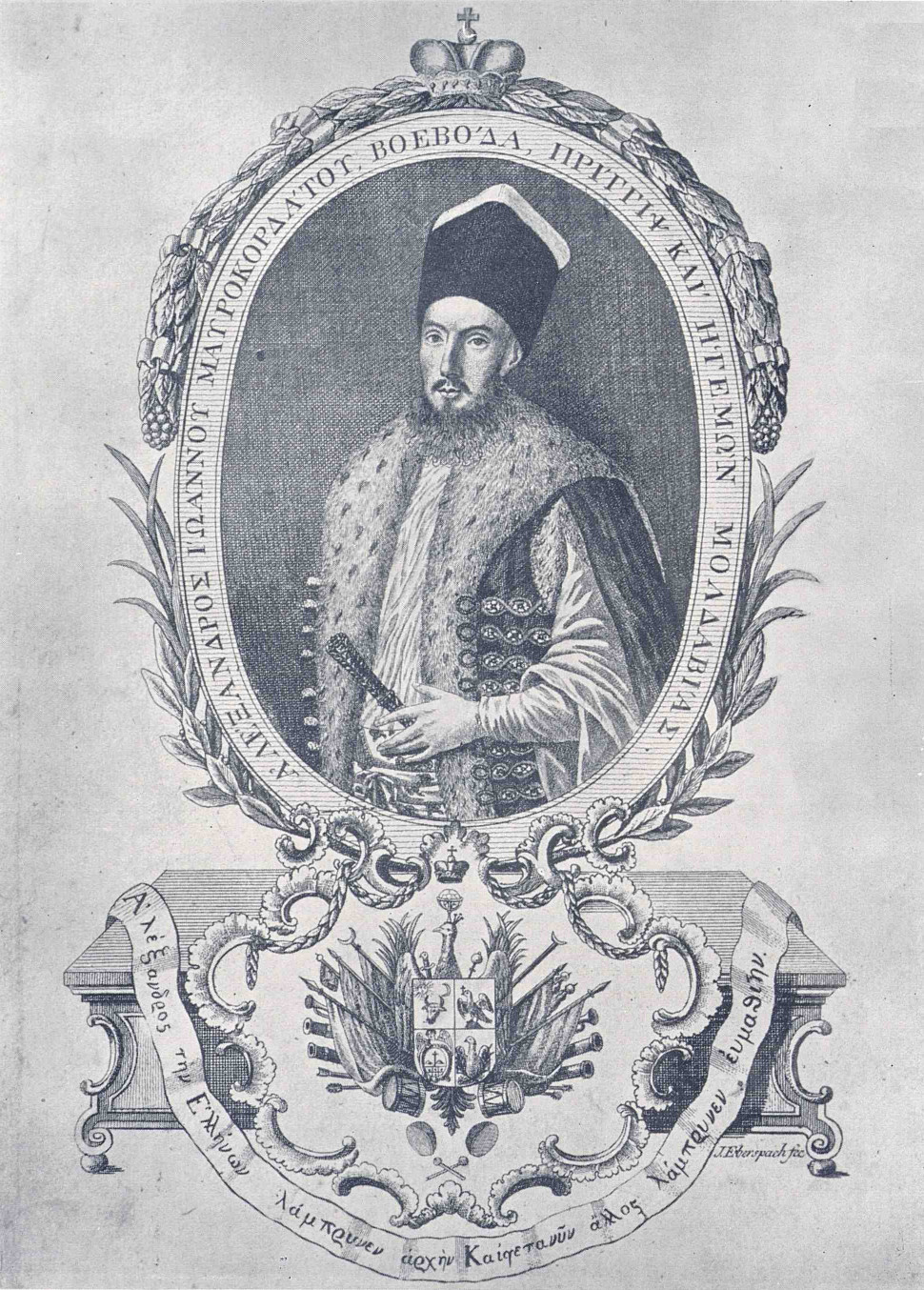

Prince of Moldavia
- Reign: 12 January 1785 – 14 December 1786
- Predecessor: Alexander Mavrocordatos Delibey
- Successor: Alexander Ypsilantis
- Born: 1 July 1754; Istanbul
- Died: 8 February 1819 (aged 64); Moscow
- House: Mavrocordatos family
- Father: John II Mavrocordatos
- Religion: Orthodox

Alexander (II) Mavrocordatos (Greek: Αλέξανδρος Μαυροκορδάτος, Romanian: Alexandru Mavrocordat al II-lea; 1 July 1754 – 8 February 1819), surnamed Firaris (Φιραρής, from Ottoman Turkish: فراری, lit. 'the Fugitive') was a Phanariote who served as Prince of Moldavia from 1785 to 1786.

== Life ==
Alexander was the son of John II Mavrocordatos, and served as Grand Dragoman from 1782 to 1785, before being Hospodar (Prince) of Moldavia from January 1785 to December 1786, succeeding his cousin Alexander I Mavrocordatos.

During the Russo-Turkish War of 1787–1792 he sided with the Russian Empire, which began to pose as a protector of Christians in the Balkans. At the end of the war he fled to Russia, whence his nickname ("firari" meaning "fugitive" in Turkish). He obtained the title of Russian Prince and died in Moscow on February 8, 1819.

Alexander II Mavrocordatos had married Zaphira or Zamfira Caradja. The couple had only one daughter who became maid of honour to the Empress Catherine II of Russia.

== Sources ==
- Alexandru Dimitrie Xenopol Histoire des Roumains de la Dacie trajane : Depuis les origines jusqu'à l'union des principautés. E Leroux Paris (1896).
- Alexandre A.C. Sturdza L'Europe Orientale et le rôle historique des Maurocordato (1660–1830) Librairie Plon Paris (1913), p. 255-266.
- Nicolae Iorga Histoire des Roumains et de la romanité orientale. (1920)
- (in Romanian) Constantin C. Giurescu & Dinu C. Giurescu, Istoria Românilor Volume III (depuis 1606), Editura Științifică și Enciclopedică, București, 1977.
- Mihail Dimitri Sturdza, Dictionnaire historique et généalogique des grandes familles de Grèce, d'Albanie et de Constantinople, M.-D. Sturdza, Paris, chez l'auteur, 1983 ASIN B0000EA1ET.
- Jean-Michel Cantacuzène, Mille ans dans les Balkans, Éditions Christian, Paris, 1992. ISBN 2-86496-054-0
- Gilles Veinstein, Les Ottomans et la mort (1996) ISBN 9004105050.
- Joëlle Dalegre Grecs et Ottomans 1453-1923. De la chute de Constantinople à la fin de l'Empire Ottoman, L'Harmattan Paris (2002) ISBN 2747521621.
- Jean Nouzille La Moldavie, Histoire tragique d'une région européenne, Ed. Bieler (2004), ISBN 2-9520012-1-9.
- Traian Sandu, Histoire de la Roumanie, Perrin (2008).
- Familiile boierești române / Octav-George Lecca / Ediție îngrijită de Alexandru Condeescu București, Fundația culturală Libra / Editura Muzeul Literaturii Române, / ISBN 973-999 14-4-0 page 639

Preceded by Alexander Mavrocordatos Delibey	Prince of Moldavia; 1785–1786	Succeeded by Alexander Ypsilantis
