= Constantine Mourouzis =

Phanariote Prince of Moldavia

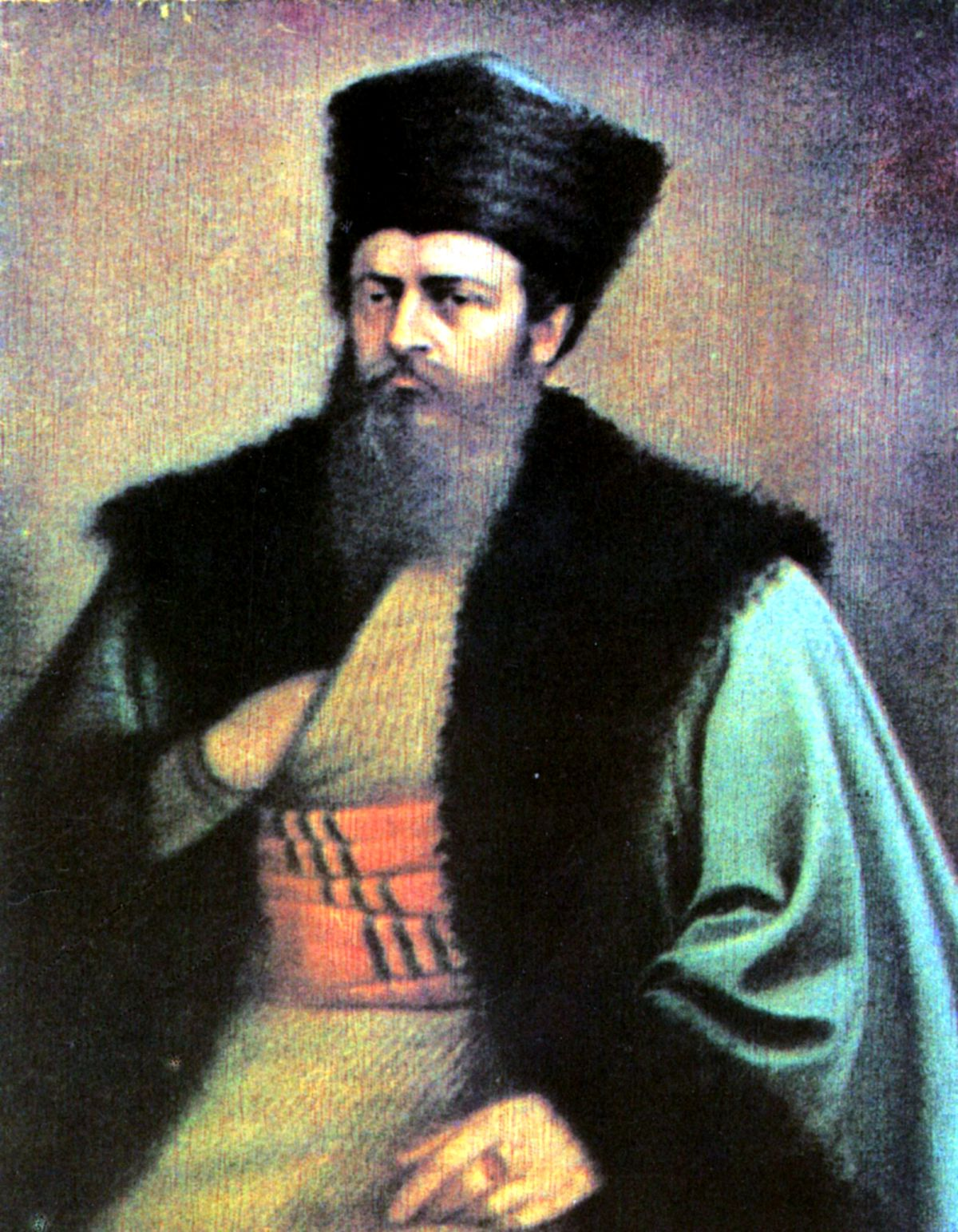

Prince of Moldavia
- Reign: 12 October 1777 – 9 June 1782
- Predecessor: Grigore III Ghica
- Successor: Alexander I Mavrocordatos
- Born: 1730; Constantinople, Ottoman Empire (now Istanbul, Turkey)
- Died: 1 May 1787 (aged 56–57); Constantinople, Ottoman Empire (now Istanbul, Turkey)
- House: Mourouzis family
- Religion: Orthodox

Prince Constantine Demetrius Mourouzis (Greek: Κωνσταντίνος Δημήτριος Μουρούζης, romanized: Konstantinos Demetrios Mourouzis, Romanian: Constantin Dimitrie Moruzi; 1730 – 1 May 1787) was a Phanariote Prince of Moldavia, and member of the Mourousis family. A remarkable polyglot, he spoke five languages: Greek, Latin, French, Arabic and Turkish.

In 1761, he became Grand Postelnic (foreign minister) in Moldavia, and soon after Dragoman of the Fleet (deputy minister) of the Ottoman Admiralty, and eventually Grand Dragoman. There are indications that he was politically involved in the dismissal and assassination of his predecessor, Grigore III Ghica, by the Porte. Trusted by the Porte, he obtained the throne of Moldavia on October 12, 1770.

Mourouzis spent much of his time in Iaşi, supervising the gathering of agricultural resources demanded by the Porte, but also sought extravagant luxury and surrounded himself with scholars, paying particular attention to schools and founding scholarships. He was deposed on June 7, 1782, and exiled to the island of Tenedos. He returned in 1783, but died soon after.

== Notes ==
Preceded by Alexander Ypsilantis	Grand Dragoman of the Porte; 1774–1777	Succeeded by Nicolae Caradja
Preceded by Grigore III Ghica	Prince/Voivode of Moldavia; 1777–1782	Succeeded by Alexander I Mavrocordatos
