= Frumoasa Monastery =

Heritage site in Iași, Romania

- Mănăstirea Frumoasa
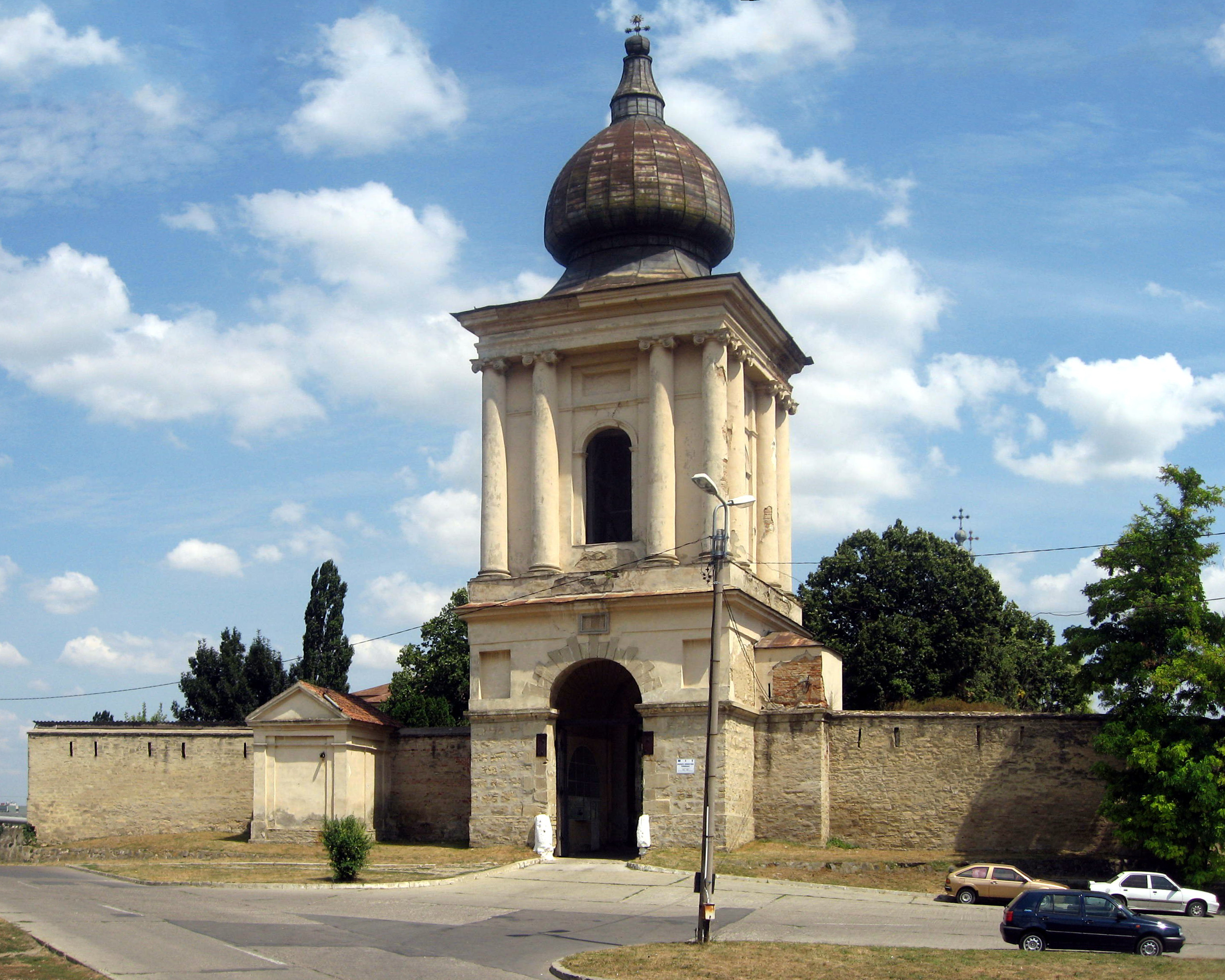
- Belfry of Frumoasa Monastery
- Frumoasa Monastery
- 47°8′21″N 27°35′14″E
- Location: Strada Radu Vodă, nr. 1, Iași
- Country: Romania
- Denomination: Romanian Orthodox Church

History
- Founder: Hetman Melentie Balica

Architecture
- Style: Neoclassical
- Groundbreaking: 1726
- Completed: 1733

Specifications
- Materials: stone, brick

The Frumoasa Monastery (Romanian: Mănăstirea Frumoasa) is a Romanian Orthodox monastery located at 1 Radu Vodă Street, in the Frumoasa neighborhood of Iași, Romania.

Built between 1726 and 1733, by Moldavian Prince Grigore II Ghica, the monastery is listed in the National Register of Historic Monuments.
