= Ypsilantis family =

Noble family

Ypsilantis Υψηλάντης Ipsilanti
- Coat of arms of Alexander Ypsilantis, Prince of Wallachia and Moldavia
- Country: Byzantine Empire; Empire of Trebizond; Ottoman Empire; Moldavia; Wallachia; Russia; Greece; Romania
- Current region: Danubian Principalities: Moldavia; Wallachia
- Origin: Pontus, Byzantine Empire (now Turkey)
- Founded: 1064
- Titles: Prince of Wallachia; Prince of Moldavia

The House of Ypsilantis or Ypsilanti (Greek: Υψηλάντης; Romanian: Ipsilanti) was a Greek Phanariote family which grew into prominence and power in Constantinople during the last centuries of Ottoman Empire and gave several short-reign hospodars to the Danubian Principalities.

== History ==
First mentioned in 1064, the family was originally from the village of İpsil (modern Arpaözü in the Çaykara district) in the Pontus region in the Black Sea, from which their surname is derived. They became prominent during the Empire of Trebizond. In 1655, Antiochus Ypsilantis left Trabzon and settled in Constantinople. Since the end of the Ottoman Empire, members of the Ypsilanti family can be found all over the world.

== Notable members ==
- Alexander Ypsilantis (1725–1805), Prince of Wallachia and Moldavia
- Constantine Ypsilantis (d. 1816), son of Alexander, Prince of Moldavia, fled to the Russian court
- Elisabeth Ypsilantis (1768–1866), wife of Constantine
- Alexander Ypsilantis (1792–1828), eldest son of Constantine. A general in the Imperial Russian Army, he became the leader of the Filiki Eteria, and began the Greek Revolution in 1821 by crossing over with his followers into the Danubian Principalities. Defeated by Ottoman forces, he retreated to Austria, where he died in 1828.
- Demetrios Ypsilantis (1793–1832), second son of Constantine Ypsilantis, one of the early leaders of the Greek Revolution, later a general under Ioannis Kapodistrias. The city of Ypsilanti, Michigan is named after him.
