= Constantin Racoviță =

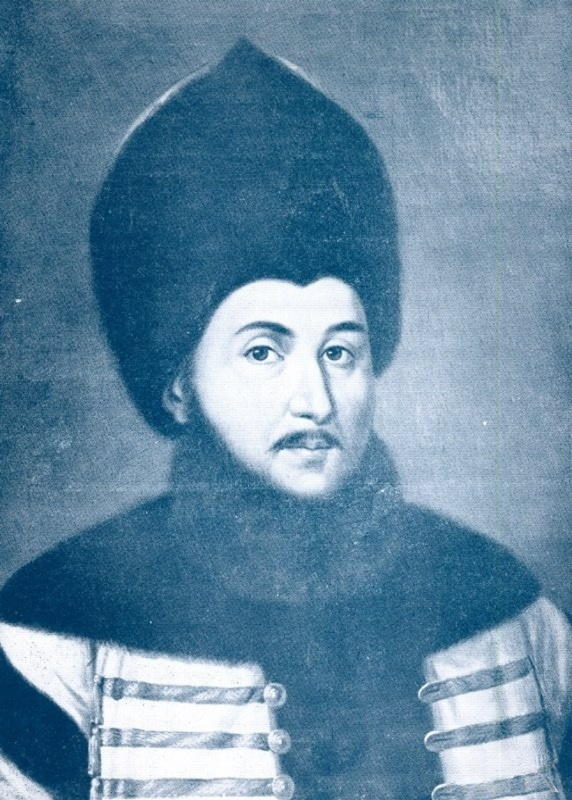

Prince of Moldavia (1st reign)
- Reign: 31 August 1749 – 3 July 1753
- Predecessor: Iordache Stavrachi
- Successor: Matei Ghica

Prince of Wallachia (1st reign)
- Reign: July 1753 – c. 28 February 1756
- Predecessor: Matei Ghica
- Successor: Constantine Mavrocordatos

Prince of Moldavia (2nd reign)
- Reign: 29 February 1756 – 14 March 1757
- Predecessor: Matei Ghica
- Successor: Scarlat Ghica

Prince of Wallachia (2nd reign)
- Reign: 9 March 1763 – 28 January 1764
- Predecessor: Constantine Mavrocordatos
- Successor: Ștefan Racoviță
- Born: 1699; Iași
- Died: 28 January 1764 (aged 64–65); Bucharest
- Father: Mihai Racoviță
- Mother: Ana Codreanu
- Religion: Orthodox

Prince Constantin Racoviţă (1699 – 28 January 1764) was twice monarch of Principality of Moldavia from Ottoman government: 31 August 1749 – 3 July 1753 and 29 February 1756 – 14 March 1757; and also twice of Wallachia: July 1753 – c. 28 February 1756 and 9 March 1763 – 28 January/8 February 1764. He struggled against the powerful boyars in Wallachia, exiling their leaders to Cyprus. Due to continued opposition he asked for a transfer to Moldavia.

He was the son of Mihai Racoviță and Ana Codreanu.

During his second Moldavian reign, Racoviță established the Church of the Prophet Samuel in Focșani.

Preceded by Iordache Stavrachi	Prince of Moldavia; 1749–1753	Succeeded by Matei Ghica
Preceded by Matei Ghica	Prince of Moldavia; 1756–1757	Succeeded by Scarlat Ghica
Preceded by Matei Ghica	Prince of Wallachia; 1753–1756	Succeeded by Constantine Mavrocordatos
Preceded by Constantine Mavrocordatos	Prince of Wallachia; 1763–1764	Succeeded by Ştefan Racoviţă
