= Alexandru Ghica =

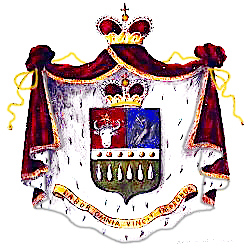

Prince of Wallachia
- Reign: 12 December 1766 – 28 October 1768
- Predecessor: Scarlat Ghica
- Successor: Grigore III Ghica
- Born: unknown
- Died: after 1768
- House: Ghica family
- Father: Scarlat Ghica
- Religion: Orthodox

Alexandru Scarlat Ghica (? – after 1768) was Voivode (Prince) of Wallachia from December 1766 to October 1768. He succeeded Scarlat Ghica.

| Preceded by Scarlat Ghica | Prince of Wallachia; 1766–1768 | Succeeded by Russian occupation |
