= Peter Zheltukhin =

Russian military officer

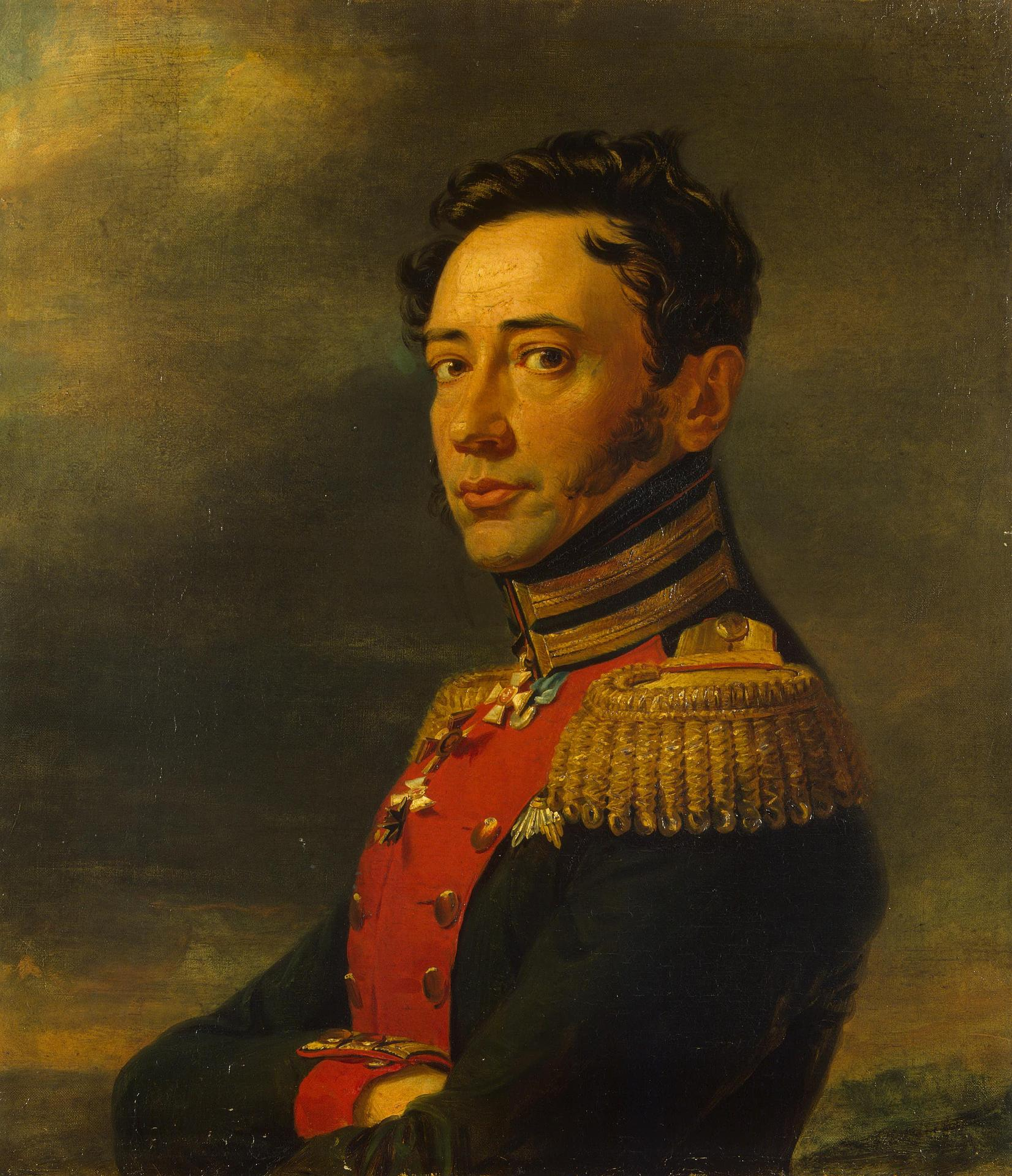
Portrait by George Dawe

Peter Zheltukhin (Russian: Пётр Фёдорович Желтухин) (1777, Kazan – 1829, Kyiv) was a Russian soldier, born to a noble family in Kazan gubernia.

A career officer he server as a Colonel at the Battle of Borodino in the Napoleonic Wars.

During the Russo-Turkish War of 1828-29 he was first made the military governor of Kiev, and in January 1829 he was appointed plenipotentiary president of the divans (assemblies) of Moldavia and Valachia under the provisions of the Organic Statute. He did not win the favour of the Romanian elites, and resigned the office in September the same year.

His older brother Sergei Fedorovich Zheltukhin was also a Russian general.
