= Constantine Mavrocordatos =

- Prince of Wallachia and Moldavia
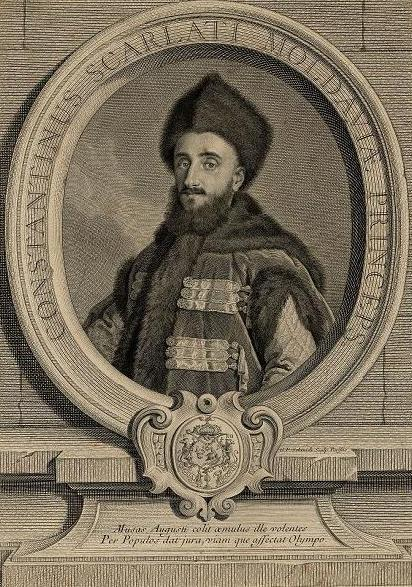
- Mavrocordatos depicted by Georg Friedrich Schmidt, 1763

Prince of Wallachia (1st reign)
- Reign: 15 September – 17 October 1730
- Predecessor: Nicholas Mavrocordatos
- Successor: Mihai Racoviță

Prince of Wallachia (2nd reign)
- Reign: 24 October 1731 – 16 April 1733
- Predecessor: Mihai Racoviță
- Successor: Grigore II Ghica

Prince of Moldavia (1st reign)
- Reign: 16 April 1733 – 26 November 1735
- Predecessor: Grigore II Ghica
- Successor: Grigore II Ghica

Prince of Wallachia (3rd reign)
- Reign: 27 November 1735 – 16 September 1741
- Predecessor: Grigore II Ghica
- Successor: Mihai Racoviță

Prince of Moldavia (2nd reign)
- Reign: 16 September 1741 – 29 July 1743
- Predecessor: Grigore II Ghica
- Successor: John II Mavrocordatos

Prince of Wallachia (4th reign)
- Reign: July 1744 – April 1748
- Predecessor: Mihai Racoviță
- Successor: Grigore II Ghica

Prince of Moldavia (3rd reign)
- Reign: April 1748 – 31 August 1749
- Predecessor: Grigore II Ghica
- Successor: Iordache Stavrach

Prince of Wallachia (5th reign)
- Reign: February 1756 – 7 September 1758
- Predecessor: Constantin Racoviță
- Successor: Scarlat Ghica

Prince of Wallachia (6th reign)
- Reign: 11 June 1761 – March 1763
- Predecessor: Scarlat Ghica
- Successor: Constantin Racoviță

Prince of Moldavia (4th reign)
- Reign: 29 June – 23 November 1769
- Predecessor: Grigore Callimachi
- Successor: Grigore III Ghica
- Born: February 27, 1711; Constantinople, Ottoman Empire
- Died: November 23, 1769 (aged 58); Iași, Moldavia
- Dynasty: Mavrocordatos family

Constantine Mavrocordatos (Greek: Κωνσταντίνος Μαυροκορδάτος, Romanian: Constantin Mavrocordat; February 27, 1711 – November 23, 1769) was a Greek noble who served as Prince of Wallachia and Prince of Moldavia at several intervals between 1730 and 1769. As a ruler he issued reforms in the laws of each of the two Danubian Principalities, ensuring a more adequate taxation and a series of measures amounting to the emancipation of serfs and a more humane treatment of slaves.

== Life ==
=== First rules ===
Born in Constantinople (now Istanbul) as a Phanariote member of the Mavrocordatos family, Constantine succeeded his father, Nicholas Mavrocordatos, as Prince of Wallachia in 1730, after obtaining boyar support. He was deprived in the same year, but again ruled the principality five more times from 1731 to 1733, from 1735 to 1741, from 1744 to 1748, from 1756 and 1758 and from 1761 to 1763. He managed to regain control over Oltenia (the Banat of Craiova) through the Treaty of Belgrade from 1739 after the Austro-Turkish War of 1737–39.

He ruled Moldavia four times from 1733 to 1735, from 1741 to 1743, from 1748 to 1749 and in 1769. He entered a personal rivalry with Grigore II Ghica; Ioan Neculce noted "Constantin-Voivode went lengths to replace Grigorie-Voivode's rule in Wallachia (...)", and subsequently "(...) as soon as they were seated on their thrones [during one of Constantine's rules in Wallachia], they began to quarrell and to report each other to the Porte without concealment".

=== Reforms and downfall ===
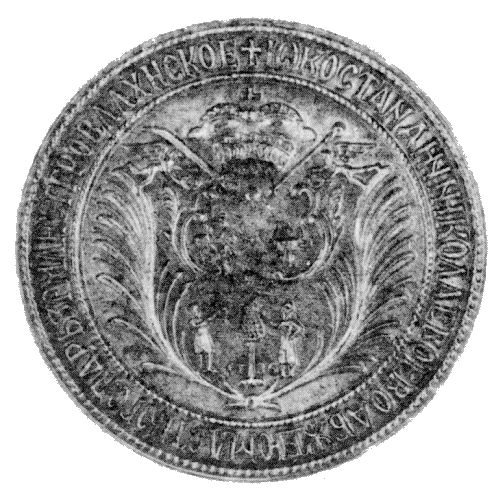
Seal of Constantin Mavrocordat

His reigns were distinguished by numerous tentative reforms in the fiscal and administrative systems, partly influenced by those of the Habsburg monarchy during their presence in Oltenia; initiated in Wallachia, they were to be applied consistently in Moldavia as well.

He was responsible for the annulment of several indirect taxes, such as the văcărit (the taxation per head of cattle), and replaced them with a single tax of 10 löwenthaler, which could be paid in four annual "quarters". Faced with the exodus of serfs to neighbouring Transylvania, Mavrocordatos allowed them freedom of movement from one boyar estate to another, in exchange for a 10 löwenthaler fee (the effective abolition of serfdom: 1746 in Wallachia, 1749 in Moldavia). At the same time, he imposed a quitrent, a 12 days-corvée, and allowed the boyars a retinue of serfs (scutelnici) that were exempted from the state tax (and owed taxes only to their liege lord). On these reforms as experienced in Moldavia, Neculce expressed his view that "were he not to have this heavy retinue of his father's, with all those insatiable people, and were he not prone on removing his cousin Grigore-Voivode from Wallachia, there would not have been such plunder in the country".

He forbade owners of slaves from separating married Gypsies belonging to different masters

The prince attempted to impose a degree of centralism in the face of boyar privilege, and, despite boyar protests, created an administration which relied on a more professional, salaried apparatus, consisting of ispravnici he himself appointed to office, and who could act as judges; he also merged the traditional personal treasury of princes with that of the Wallachian administrative body, and decided to deny boyar title to families whose members no longer held official appointments. In 1761, due to the reforms' effects, the Ban of Oltenia moved his seat from Craiova to Bucharest, leaving the region to be ruled by a kaymakam.

Mavrocordatos was wounded and taken prisoner by the Russian troops of Catherine II, after his resistance in Galați during the Fifth Russo-Turkish War, on November 5, 1769. He was taken to Iași where he died in captivity. Despite their attempts to have the reforms overturned, boyars had to deal with their effects, as successive rulers confirmed the laws' scope.

== Notes ==
Preceded by Nicholas Mavrocordatos	Prince of Wallachia; 1730	Succeeded by Mihai Racoviță
Preceded by Mihai Racoviță	Prince of Wallachia; 1731–1733	Succeeded by Grigore II Ghica
Preceded by Grigore II Ghica	Prince of Moldavia; 1733–1735	Succeeded by Grigore II Ghica
Preceded by Grigore II Ghica	Prince of Wallachia; 1735–1741	Succeeded by Mihai Racoviță
Preceded by Grigore II Ghica	Prince of Moldavia; 1741–1743	Succeeded by John Mavrocordatos
Preceded by Mihai Racoviţă	Prince of Wallachia; 1744–1748	Succeeded by Grigore II Ghica
Preceded by Grigore II Ghica	Prince of Moldavia; 1748–1749	Succeeded by Iordache Stavrachi
Preceded by Constantin Racoviţă	Prince of Wallachia; 1756–1758	Succeeded by Scarlat Ghica
Preceded by Scarlat Ghica	Prince of Wallachia; 1761–1763	Succeeded by Constantin Racoviță
Preceded by Grigore Callimachi	Prince of Moldavia; 1769	Succeeded by Russian occupation
