= Mavrokordatos family =

Princely family of Greek origin

Mavrokordatos Μαυροκορδάτος
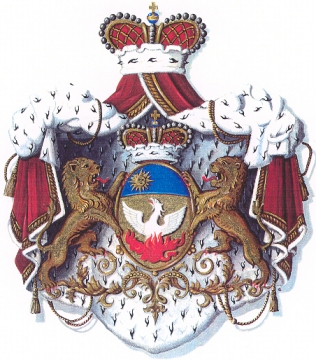
- Coat of arms of the Mavrokordatos family

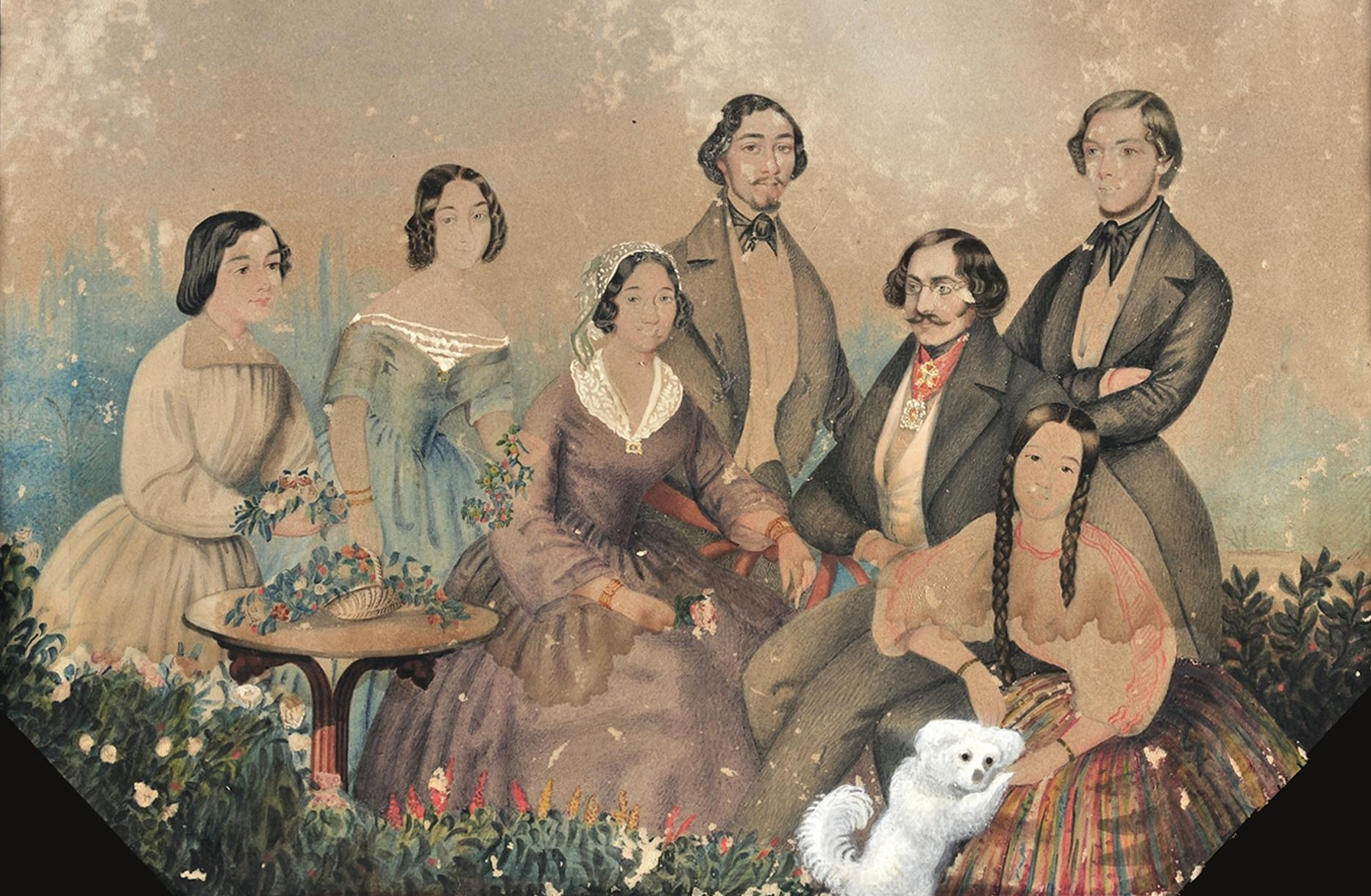
- A portrait of the Mavrokordatos family in the 19th century
- Country: Holy Roman Empire; Ottoman Empire; Romania; Russia; Greece
- Current region: Danubian Principalities: Moldavia; Wallachia
- Origin: Chios
- Founded: 16th century
- Founder: Nikolaos Mavrokordatos
- Titles: Imperial Count of the Holy Roman Empire; Prince of Wallachia; Prince of Moldavia; Prince of Russia

The House of Mavrokordatos (Greek: Μαυροκορδάτος), variously also Mavrocordato, Mavrocordatos, Mavrocordat (in Wallachia and Moldavia), Mavrogordato or Maurogordato, is the name of a family of Phanariot Greeks originally from Chios, in which a branch rose to a princely rank and was distinguished in the history of the Ottoman Empire, Wallachia, Moldavia, and modern Greece.

== History ==
The family was founded by the merchant Nikolaos Mavrokordatos (1522–1570) from the island of Chios. They rose through the ranks of the nobility of Chios and were given the title of Count of the Holy Roman Empire by Leopold I, Holy Roman Emperor, in 1699. Later they became hospodars of Wallachia and Moldavia. In 1875 the Mavrocordatoi were also recognized as princes of the Russian Empire by Emperor Alexander II of Russia.

== Notable members ==
- Alexandra Mavrokordatou (1605–1684), spouse of the founder, intellectual and salonnière

- Alexander Mavrocordatos "the Exaporite" (1641–1709), son of the founder and of Alexandra Mavrokordatou, styled prince ("Serene Highness") in 1699 by Leopold I, Holy Roman Emperor

- Nicholas Mavrocordatos (1670–1730), Alexander's son, ruler of Wallachia (two times) and Moldavia (two times)

- Constantine Mavrocordatos (1711–1769), Nicholas' son, ruler of Moldavia (four times) and Wallachia (six times)

- Alexander I Mavrokordatos "Delibey", ruler of Moldavia (1782–1785)

- Alexander Mavrokordatos, Nicholas' son

- Nicholas Mavrokordatos, ban of Wallachia

- Alexandros Mavrokordatos (1791–1865), Prime Minister of Greece (four times)

- John II Mavrocordatos, Nicholas' son, ruler of Moldavia (1743–1747)

- Alexander II Mavrokordatos "Firaris", ruler of Moldavia (1785–1786)

- John Mavrocordatos (1684–1719), Alexander's son, ruler of Wallachia, caimacam of Moldavia
