= 2012 Romanian protests =

Anti-corruption demonstrations

- Part of 2012–2015 unrest in Romania
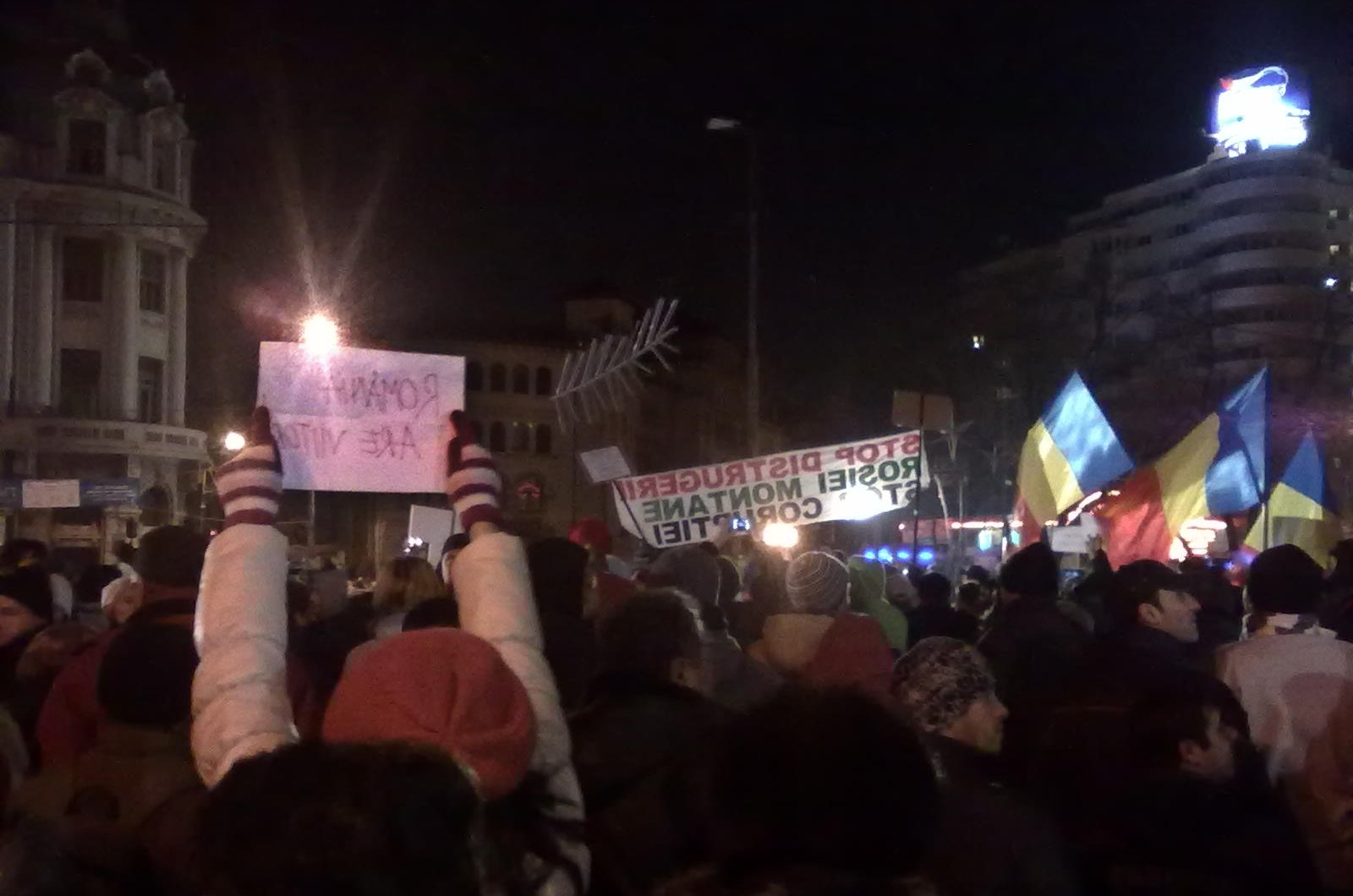
- Demonstrations at University Square, Bucharest
- Date: 12 January 2012 – 20 April 2012 (first phase); 4 June 2012 – 9 December 2012 (second phase)
- Location: 62 cities in Romania, including Bucharest; Diaspora: (Austria) Vienna (Belgium) Brussels (Canada) Montreal (Denmark) Aarhus (France) Paris, Strasbourg (Germany) Berlin (Republic of Ireland) Dublin (Italy) Brescia, Padua, Rome, Trieste (Moldova) Chișinău (Netherlands) The Hague (Portugal) Lisbon (Spain) Madrid, Zaragoza (United Kingdom) London; Vatican City
- Caused by: Tax raises, salary cuts, unemployment, economic conditions, political corruption
- Goals: Resignation of President Traian Băsescu; Resignation of Prime Minister Emil Boc; Early elections
- Methods: Civil disobedience; Demonstrations; Picketing; Lock-ons; Die-ins; Sit-ins; Rioting; Hunger strike; Labor strike; Occupations; Vandalism; Revolts; Online activism
- Status: Ended
- Concessions: Dismissal of the Minister of Foreign Affairs, Teodor Baconschi; Resignation of Prime Minister Emil Boc and his cabinet; Dismissal of Prime Minister Mihai Răzvan Ungureanu and his cabinet; Suspension of President Traian Băsescu

Number
| Over 13,000 participants throughout Romania (incl. political rallies) | |

Casualties
- Injuries: 88
- Arrested: 283 in mid-January clashes

The 2012 Romanian protests were a series of protests and civil manifestations triggered by the introduction of new health reform legislation. In particular, President Traian Băsescu criticized the Deputy Minister of Health, Raed Arafat, on a Romanian television broadcast. The protests became violent, with both protesters and members of the Gendarmerie sustaining injuries during their clashes.

On the morning of 5 February 2012, Prime Minister Emil Boc announced his resignation because of the protests. He said that his decision would release the tension in the country's political and social situation. Protests, on a lesser scale, continued in University Square in Bucharest. The protesters demanded the president's resignation and early general elections. There were ongoing protests in Romania in subsequent months over a variety of disagreements.

== Causes of January protests ==
=== Parliamentary legislation of 2010 ===
In 2010, in the recession of the late 2000s, the Boc government, with the support of president Traian Băsescu, imposed a series of tax increases and cuts in public sector wages and social benefits. Boc also imposed a new labour code, which was informed by multinational corporations and business representatives such as the Romanian-American Chamber of Commerce, the major Romanian trade unions, and some employers' organizations. At the time, the Boc government ruled by only a small majority and the parliamentary opposed all the new measures. Boc therefore used a special procedure provided by the Constitution of Romania to pass the new measures.

=== Parliamentary legislation of 2011 ===
In the last days of 2011, the government introduced a new healthcare bill. It would have reduced state funded health benefits, de-regulated the health insurance market, and privatised Romanian hospitals.

=== Objection by Raed Arafat ===
One of the main objectors was the undersecretary, Raed Arafat, the founder of the "Mobile Service Emergency Resuscitation and Extrication" (SMURD) service, a public emergency service partially funded by private donations and partially by the government. His concern was the privatization of emergency services, which he believed would lead to the disappearance of the public service, as for-profit emergency service companies would have access to both private and public funds. President Băsescu criticised Arafat for his opposition. On 9 January 2012, in a phone call to a TV talk show, Băsescu suggested Arafat leave the Cabinet. Arafat resigned the following day, citing the main reason as the need for a fair criticism of the healthcare bill from outside the government. On 10 January, in Bucharest, Arafat and SMURD met to unite in opposition. On 11 January, an Arafat-SMURD solidarity meeting was held in Cluj-Napoca in the north-west.

=== SMURD demonstrations ===
On 12 January 2012, demonstrations grew in size and spread to Târgu Mureş, the base of SMURD. There, 1,500 to 4,000 people took part in a march organised with the help of the social networking site, "Facebook". As well as supporting SMURD, the marches also started to call for the resignation of Băsescu.

=== Băsescu ===
On 13 January 2012, in the evening, president Băsescu held a press conference and asked for the bill to be quashed, citing resistance from the populace. He also criticised those opposing the bill for cronyism. The health minister Ladislau Ritli, acquiesced. Despite these actions, protests continued.

== Course of the protests ==
External media

Images
- University Square clash gallery

Video
- Molotov cocktails versus tear gas: New wave of Romania violence on YouTube
- Romania clashes video: Anti-cuts protests turn violent in Bucharest on YouTube
- Scuffles at anti-government protest in Bucharest on YouTube
- 'We want him out': Anger burning in Romania on YouTube
- Protests in Romania (January 15, 2012) on YouTube
- University Square – Occupying the street on YouTube

=== First phase ===
On 12 January 2012, a non-violent protest was held in Târgu Mureș to express solidarity with the SMURD founder, Raed Arafat. People gathered in the center of Târgu Mureș moved on the march towards the SMURD headquarters, blocking traffic, and demonstrators were joined by several hundred people, so that their number reached approximately 3,000. Several petitions had drawn up on social networking websites, these having hundreds of thousands, even millions of upholders.

On 13 January 2012, in the evening, a rally was held at the University Square, in Bucharest to support Arafat. At around 19:00 local time, protesters marched towards the Cotroceni Palace. The number of demonstrators increased to about 2,000. Other large anti-presidential manifestations were organized in Bucharest, Brașov, Timișoara and Sibiu. No meeting was authorized.

On 14 January 2012, protesters rallied at University Square and outside the gates of Cotroceni Palace. To avoid clashes, protective fences were installed. Around 18:00 local time, protesters blocked the Nicolae Bălcescu Boulevard. After the intervention of gendarmes, Nicolae Bălcescu Boulevard was cleared and people were pushed to the sidewalk.

Around 20:50 local time, protesters threw stones at the gendarmes. The Gendarmerie and police officers used tear gas to disperse the demonstrators.

Ambulance Bucharest and SMURD crews intervened for medical care to 20 people. Of these, five were gendarmes. Likewise, an operator of Antena 3 was injured during the protests, after being hit by a brick thrown into the melee. Gendarmes picked up 29 protesters, after they threw blunt objects and have disturbed public order.

On 15 January 2012, the demonstrations continued. From the early morning, protesters gathered in the squares of Romania's main cities. They waved Romanian flags cut in the middle (the symbol of the 1989 Romanian Revolution). They called for early elections. The Social Liberal Union (USL) (the parliamentary opposition coalition) demanded an extraordinary plenary meeting of the parliament.

In the mid afternoon, about one hundred people, mostly former revolutionaries, gathered in Victory Square, Timişoara, to protest. The meeting was authorized and was scheduled to end at 17:00, when supporters of football team Poli Timişoara were expected to arrive in the square. An elderly man chanting in favor of Băsescu was escorted by the gendarmes from the area. During the night, most protesters at University Square maintained a non-violent stance, while smaller groups tried to destroy police barricades. Some allege manipulation of the demonstrations (for example, the police intentionally allowing hooligan activity) for political reasons. In Iaşi's Union Square, a meeting of solidarity with Arafat was organised by the Iaşi National Liberal Party's (PNL) youth organization. They were joined by others who gathered in Palace of Culture Square.

Elias Bucurica, a member of the National Union for the Progress of Romania (UNPR), which supported the government was seen at a demonstration. Pictures of Bucurica at a UNPR rally supporting Neculai Ontanu, Bucharest 2nd District mayor, were published on 19 October 2010. Pictures of Bucurica at the launch of USP (UNPR's center-left political platform) were published on 21 December 2011. It is alleged that demonstrators vandalised a route from Union Square to Tineretului Park (the largest park in Bucharest's 4th District).

Cristian Popescu Piedone, the mayor of the 4th District had resigned from office in the Conservative Party (PC), (part of USL) and intended to contest the mayoral election as a UNPR candidate. Piedone later said,

We should not turn this case into a political one and parties that want to profit from these events will probably have to explain themselves.

Gabriel Oprea, Defense Minister in the Boc Government and president of UNPR said,

It is pure demagogy, there is no connection between the people that were there and UNPR.

George Becali, owner of Steaua Bucharest football club, stated that among the hooligans involved in the events, there were Steaua Bucharest ultras led by Catalin Zisu, a general in the Ministry of National Defence of Romania. General Catalin Zisu declined to comment on Becali's allegations although he might have known about them.

Small groups of ultras were led by Tararache Marius, Țintă Claudiu from Dinamo Bucharest and Denescu Alexandru Mihai from Steaua Bucharest. On 17 January 2012, Mihai Capatana was arrested for 29 days for vandalism in connection with the events.

On 16 January 2012, protestors in large numbers gathered again at University Square, Bucharest. Police kept the peace. The Gendarmerie monitored key locations in Bucharest such as subway access points. They stopped demonstrators carrying weapons into the university area as well as arresting those with weapons at the rallies. No significant violent events took place. Around 23:20 local time, on Brătianu Boulevard, gendarmes surrounded around 70 ultras, heading towards the University Square. They were asked to identify themselves and subsequently loaded onto trucks.

Demonstrators from Union Square, Cluj-Napoca, whose number reached about 600, initiated an evening march through the city center, chanting anti-government and anti-presidential slogans and carrying large Romanian flags.

On 17 January, protests in Bucharest continued. Hundreds of people gathered in the middle of the day with numbers rising towards the evening. Prime Minister Boc invited the USL opposition alliance to talks to be held the following day at the Palace of Parliament. The co-presidents of the USL, PNL leader Crin Antonescu and Social Democratic Party leader Victor Ponta, announced the agenda. The first item was the immediate resignation of the Democratic Liberal Party Government of Emil Boc and early elections. Protests took place in 60 other Romanian cities involving over 5,000 people.

Arafat returned to his former position as under-secretary of state. He declared that his initial resignation was because of the health bill and since the bill was revoked, he could resume his role. He also stressed that the protesters no longer referenced him specifically and he would not make any further comment about the protests.

In Constanţa, building safety inspectors (an agency of the Ministry of Regional Development) visited City Hall to question the Mayor, Radu Ştefan Mazăre, about the legality of a number of tents he set up near the protesters' location. These tents were serving protesters with hot tea. In response to the investigation, Radu Mazăre expelled the inspectors and joined the protesters in the street. He thus became the first politician to join the demonstrators. He has stated that his presence was not as Mayor or politician, but as a citizen.

In Alexandria, Teleorman County, hundreds of people, including unemployed citizens, pensioners, civil servants and trade unionists protested on the plaza of the House of Culture. They were joined by dozens of people coming from Roşiori de Vede by bus. As well as demanding Băsescu's resignation, the people also called for the resignation of the county prefect, Teodor Nițulescu.

19 January 2012 was one of the most violent days of the protests. Between 1,500 and 20,000 people gathered in central Bucharest. Revolutionaries, young people, office workers, members of the USL, gendarmes, football fans and politicians gathered in University Square. Protesters at University Square threw bottles and stones at the gendarmes. 30 to 40 protesters were arrested. In Arch of Triumph Square a USL meeting was organized. The participants were greeted with hostility by protesters from the University Square, Ludovic Orban being pushed and booed by them.

On 23 January, over 3,000 people demonstrated in several cities. Teodor Baconschi, the foreign minister tendered his resignation after having called the protesters "clueless and inept slum dwellers".

Lieutenant Gheorghe Alexandru, aged 27, a member of Air 71 Flotilla Câmpia Turzii, arrived in uniform among the protesters in University Square in Bucharest. He chose to join demonstrators in Bucharest out of "respect for his nation" and to demonstrate that "the Army did not leave". He acknowledged that there would be consequences for him.

On 24 January, on the twelfth day of (mostly non-violent) protests continued in Victory Square. Some entered the TVR public television headquarters accusing the broadcaster of censorship. Băsescu spoke about the protests.

On 25 January 2012, the protests continued despite inclement weather. Băsescu addressed the nation to give reassurance. He advised he would not resign unless it became the only obvious solution to the political crisis. He promised to act on the reform referendum of 2009.

=== Second phase ===
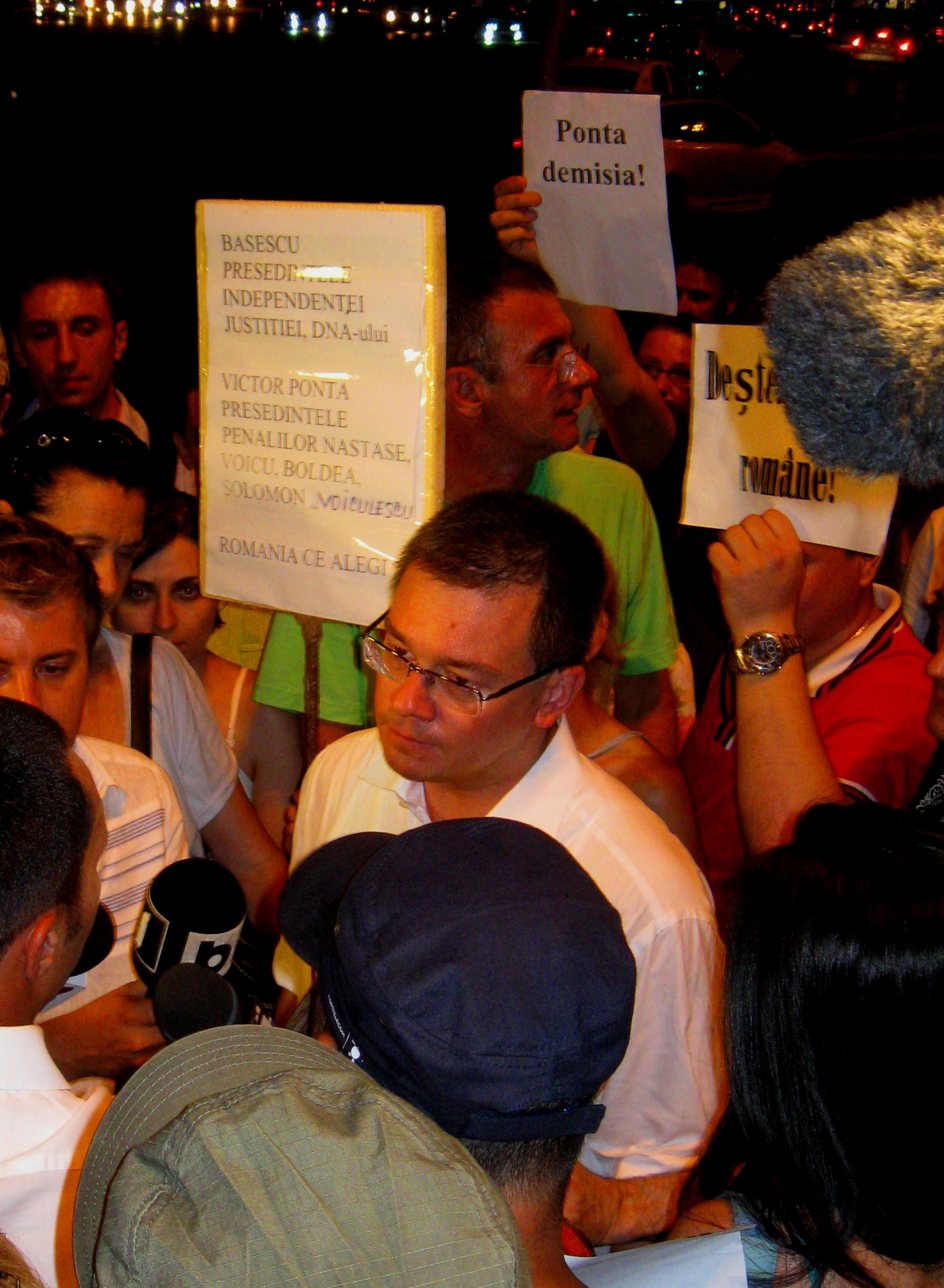
Mihai Răzvan Ungureanu at Victory Square protest, on 6 July 2012

External videos
- "The protest of inverted commas" (3 July) on YouTube
- Peaceful protest in University Square (4 July) on YouTube
- Peaceful protest in University Square (5 July) on YouTube
- Peaceful protest in University Square (6 July) on YouTube

From 24 April to 1 May 2012, thousands of people from the three historical regions – Moldavia, Transylvania and Wallachia – attended the protest march "Give my Romania back!". The protest march was organized similarly to the Wallachian uprising of 1821, with starting points in Brăila, Ploiești, Galați, Constanța, Sibiu, Deva, Arad, Brad, Brașov, Craiova, Slatina and the final destination in University Square (Bucharest). The participants demanded, among many other claims, the resignation of President Traian Băsescu and the Ungureanu Cabinet.

In early July, demonstrations took place in several locations in Bucharest. Hundreds of Romanians, among them former Prime Minister Ungureanu, gathered in front of the Romanian Government building demanding Ponta's resignation in light of the plagiarism scandal. Others protested in the University Square against a variety of issues, including shale gas extraction, corruption in the Romanian Professional Football League and also against Romanian politicians in general. On 6 July, President Băsescu was suspended by the Romanian Parliament. Pro-USL supporters in their hundreds gathered in University Square to show their support for the move.

== Reactions ==
Initially, the government made no comment on the January protests. The first official comment came from Boc on 16 January 2012. He said the protests were threatening Romania's economic stability and that a new law of Public Health was being drafted. He further stated that freedom of speech is guaranteed, but that street violence was unacceptable. On 17 January 2012, Boc said,

each citizen who protests and is unhappy concerns (him).

Other PDL party members criticised the protests. Senator Iulian Urban said pro-Arafat protesters were,

worms that deserve their fate.

Baconschi said the protests were, instigated by the opposition" and compared them to the Mineriads of the 1990s. Sever Voinescu-Cotoi, a PDL spokesman, said the protesters were 'neurotic' and suggested they watch The Death of Mr. Lazarescu, a Romanian film about the country's healthcare system. Romanians abroad organized peaceful protests in Lisbon, Madrid, Zaragoza, Paris, Strasbourg, Brussels, The Hague, London, Dublin, Aarhus, Berlin, Vienna, Trieste, Padua, Rome and Chișinău.

The United States has asked the Romanian authorities and people to avoid the violence that has spread in mid-January throughout the country, U.S. Department of State spokesperson Victoria Nuland announced at a press briefing, on 20 January.

The Bucharest Gendarmerie chief, Brigadier General Eugen Meran, was dismissed, on 11 January 2013, for mismanagement. The reason for his dismissal is the abuses committed by his subordinates during the protests in January 2012 in the University Square.

== Consequences ==
On the evening of 13 January 2012, Băsescu urged Boc to abandon the health bill. He said,

There are many who are satisfied with the health system and that reform is not wanted by anyone in the system, except for some doctors.

On 17 January 2012, Arafat returned to his government office. On 6 February 2012, Boc and his government resigned. Băsescu nominated Mihai Răzvan Ungureanu to form a new government. On 1 February 2012, law 220/2011 created a co-pay service. Romanian citizens do purchase health insurance, but the co-pay system involves a means tested "gap" fee for basic consults. Emergency healthcare remains free. The new public health law allows the state to sponsor private medical institutions that provide emergency health care. However, as Raed Arafat warned, the government sponsorship does not guarantee a minimum level of emergency healthcare to all patients and government support would also be diverted from the public sector.

For all that, two months later, Romania's government has been unseated in a no-confidence vote. The opposition seized on public anger over austerity measures to oust prime minister Mihai Răzvan Ungureanu. The centre-right coalition had cut salaries and raised sales tax to try to put the economy on a more sound footing. Romanian President Traian Băsescu designated left-wing opposition leader Victor Ponta as new prime minister.

In 2003, Ponta completed a thesis titled International criminal court. It was republished with a co-author in 2004. A further academic piece was produced in 2012 (Responsibility under international humanitarian law) where Coman was cited first. A number of Romanian academics made allegations of plagiarism against Ponta to the science periodical, Nature. They included Vlad Perju and Paul Dragos Aligica (Romanian political scientists holding academic positions in the United States) and Marius Andruh (president of the Romanian council for the recognition of university diplomas). Ponta denied wrongdoing and accused President Traian Băsescu of formulating the allegations against him. In turn, Ponta called for Băsescu's departure, citing his announcement of wage cuts and tax increases in 2012 as actions beyond his constitutional remit.

== Other protests ==
=== Miners ===
On 8 March 2012, over 5,000 miners gathered in front of the National Coal Company headquarters. They expressed anger and determination. The miners blocked the entrance to Petroşani (Hunedoara County), on DN66. Protestors in Bucharest booed Băsescu as he spoke from the balcony of the Palace of Parliament. Protestors shouted,

Resignation!

Another shouted,

King Mihai.

They threw paper on which was written,

Traian Băsescu, the first and the last.

Basescu said,

Well, wait until I finish....

At least five protesters were removed after which Băsescu continued.

On 3 October, several NGO "Regeneration" activists gathered in front of Government, and four of them chained and handcuffed themselves to the main entrance gate into Victoria Palace, accusing the government supports the mining with cyanide and has not taken any measures to prevent situations, such as granting the environmental permit for mining project in Certej. Minister Delegate for Social Dialogue, Liviu Pop, on the way to the government meeting, stopped to talk with protesters and asked them to submit official documents which they have transmitted to the Government with these problems. One of the protesters was chained to the gate of the Government with a steel bicycle antitheft device, that gendarmes tried to cut with a hacksaw blade, but without success. They would then cut device with a flex, but by the station were advised to abandon this idea, because of the risk that the protester can be hurt. Finally, gendarmes requested the intervention of the fire crew, who managed to cut the device with a pneumatic extrication device. On 9 December, simultaneously with the legislative election, took place, in 35 localities in Alba County, a referendum on restarting mining in the Apuseni Mountains.

The protests of miners in Jiu Valley continued the next year. Thus, on 11 January 2013, at least 307 miners blocked themselves in Lupeni coal mine, refusing to leave the workplace at the end of the program, because they were dissatisfied with salaries that were reduced due to non-fulfillment of the productivity plan.

=== Exploitation of shale gas ===
On 21 March 2012, thousands of people protested in Bârlad (Vaslui County) against the American company Chevron that mines shale gas in Romania. Constantin Constantinescu of the Bârlad City Hall, petitioned against the use of hydraulic fracture mining of gas. Four days after the protests that took place in the center of Bârlad, attended by over 5,000 people, Chevron Corporation representatives expressed their official position regarding the techniques they will use in exploration and exploitation of shale gas in northeastern Romania. "We understand the concerns about shale gas production in Romania and we believe that after Chevron will present accurate information resulting from research, Romanians will understand that natural gas from shale is a clean energy source and that can be produced responsibly and safely", said in a press release Tom Holst, Chevron Romania country manager.

The protests continued in the following months. Thus, thousands of people gathered in Bârlad Civic Center to protest against shale gas extraction through hydraulic fractionation. The protest was preceded by two marches that have left simultaneously from Ready-made clothing manufactory and Public Garden areas. Protesters were joined by employees from the Directorate of Social Assistance and Child Protection arrived from Vaslui, priests and inhabitants of neighboring villages of Bârlad. During protest, priests sang "Christ is risen!", and people sang the anthem of Romania. There have been attempts on social networks to mobilize people to come to the protest. They say they want and a clean air and environment.

Two thousand people marched peacefully, on 14 September, in the city of Bârlad, with lit candles and lamps, led by priests in the area. They oppose the exploitation of shale gas through hydraulic fracturing method, which U.S. company Chevron would begin in the county.

On 27 February 2013, more than 7,000 citizens protested in Bârlad against exploitation of shale gas. The march, organized by the Bârlad Civil Society Initiative Group, gathered representatives of Bârlad and surrounding parishes, environmental activists, FC Vaslui gallery representatives, but also citizens who are against the exploitation of shale gas through hydraulic fracturing method by the American company Chevron.

On 4 April 2013, tens of thousands of people protested in more than 20 cities across the country under the slogan "Romania says no hydraulic fracturing". The protests were organized by over 80 non-governmental organizations. Protesters demanded the cancellation of Government decisions through which were approved the agreements of exploration, development and exploitation issued to Chevron, East West Petroleum and Clara Petroleum.

=== Football ===
On 24 March 2012, 200 supporters of FC Universitatea Craiova joined supporters of FC Dinamo București and FC Rapid București to protest in front of the Palace of the Parliament. They opposed the decision of the executive committee of FRF to disaffiliate them. The gendarmes used tear gas. Over 37 people were arrested.

Over 2,000 supporters of FC Universitatea Cluj gathered, on 7 September, on Heroes Boulevard (Cluj-Napoca) to support their team. Armed with scarves, banners, flags supporters protested against the manner in which Anamaria Prodan leads club. Subsequently, Anamaria Prodan said that the team will remain in Cluj-Napoca and that used the announcement that moves it in Buzău to take out the fans in the street and, thus, to persuade local authorities to support the club she leads.

=== Dockworkers ===
On 9 April 2012, over 100 employees of the National Company of Maritime Ports Administration Constanța gathered in the company's courtyard and blocked entrances to the company's headquarters. They demanded the resignation of Aurelian Popa, the director. When Popa arrived, his path was blocked and he was pelted with eggs and yoghurt. The gendarmes intervened.

The employees' protests continued. They cited abuse of power and breaches of the collective agreement. At times the protests became violent with some arrested.

=== Revolutionaries ===
Dozens of revolutionaries protested, on 8 October, in front of the headquarters of the PSD alongside the weekly meeting of the party, requesting the dismissal of Secretary of State Sorin Meșter and the solving of revolutionaries' situation. They also booed and heckled the former head of state Ion Iliescu. They chanted "Down with Iliescu!", "PSD without Iliescu!" and requested that a representative of the party leadership to come to talks. "You can not mock us! What are we, dogs? We became beggars!", revolutionaries told to Iliescu. They also said that they want the returning of rights taken improperly. Former head of state told the revolutionaries that former Prime Minister Emil Boc has removed these rights. Three protesters needed medical care, after they had felt bad. The three revolutionaries have a precarious health status after they decided to go on hunger strike, until will be resumed the payment of indemnities from the Government.

=== Interethnical disputes ===
==== Hungarian minority ====
On 1 September, some 25,000 Hungarians protested in Sfântu Gheorghe, after, on 22 August, PCM Covasna leadership urged Hungarians to participate in large number at protest against the sentence for restitution of "Székely Mikó" College, occasion to also manifest for Székely Land autonomy. In the declaration at the beginning of the manifest, which was read by Kató Béla, auxiliary bishop of the Reformed Diocese of Transylvania, was shown that Hungarians across Romania protest against the injustice suffered by this community. At the end of the manifest, protesters have made claims in five points, they requesting, among others, consistent implementation of the rule of law and urgent realization of restitutio in integrum. Thus, were created tensions between the Hungarian community in Romania and Romanians, as much, on 6 October, approximately 50 members of the New Right movement participated, in Arad, at a march against "Hungarian irredentism" and to commemorate the Romanian heroes of the Revolution of 1848–1849. The action took place in protest of manifests regarding the commemoration of Hungarian heroes of the Revolution of 1848–1849, held on the same day in Romanian-Hungarian Reconciliation Park in Arad and attended by over 500 people, including representatives of UDMR, headed by President Kelemen Hunor, guests from Budapest and local authorities.

==== Roma minority ====
After 2010, many Romanian citizens of Roma ethnicity emigrated to the Western Europe, so, in summer 2012, 15,000 Romanies lived in France. Most of Romanies obligated their children to panhandle in crowded areas of the capital, Paris. During the 2012 elections, Claude Guéant, former French Minister of the Interior, intensified his campaign to remove Roma from visible places. He prohibited begging on Champs-Élysées and in other tourist areas of Paris.

In August 2012, the Socialist government of François Hollande began evicting and dismantling Roma camps and deporting Roma. A charter plane flew 240 Gypsies, including their children, to Romania, from Lyon. According to Manuel Valls, Minister of the Interior, the evictions were based on sanitary concerns and tensions with working class neighbours.

Inasmuch as the situation has not improved, Minister of the Interior of France, Manuel Valls, and Minister Delegate for European Affairs, Bernard Cazeneuve, visited Romania on 12 September, to discuss with the authorities in Bucharest the matter of social inclusion of Romanian citizens of Roma ethnicity. On this occasion, a bilateral cooperation agreement was signed on this subject.

Irritated by this visit, over 500 Roma protested in front of the Cotroceni Palace, after they also chanted in front of the Government premises. Organizers, dissatisfied with the lack of interest and action of Roma inclusion Executive, specified that the protest is directly related to French Ministers visit to Romania. President of the Civic Democratic Alliance of Roma, Marian Daragiu, specified for Mediafax that protest aims to draw attention, first and foremost, of the Romanian Government, that it can not apprehend in Roma issue only when somebody twitches it. Likewise, he catalogued as "racist" the assertion of French Minister of the Interior, Manuel Valls, pursuant to that France "can not get all the garbage in the world and Europe".

=== Local parliament electoral irregularities ===
During the 10 June local elections, residents of Curcani (Călărași County), protested after a candidate and four others wrecked a polling station and accosted voters. The candidate was arrested but the protestors alleged electoral irregularities. In Petrila (Hunedoara County), an old man tried to set himself on fire because of a land dispute. He was saved and hospitalised.

=== Suspended president reinstated ===
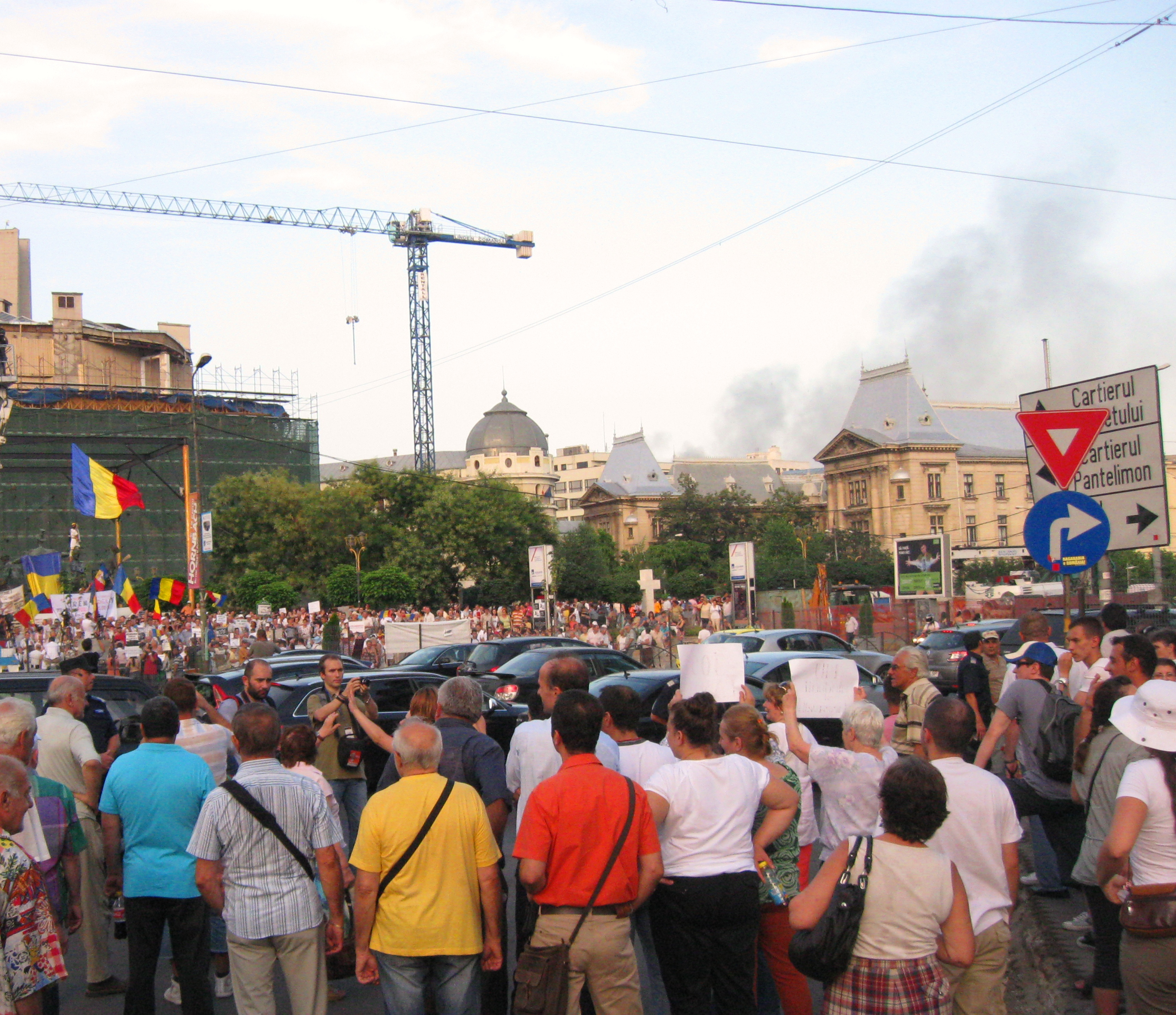
Anti-Băsescu protests in Bucharest, on 5 July 2012

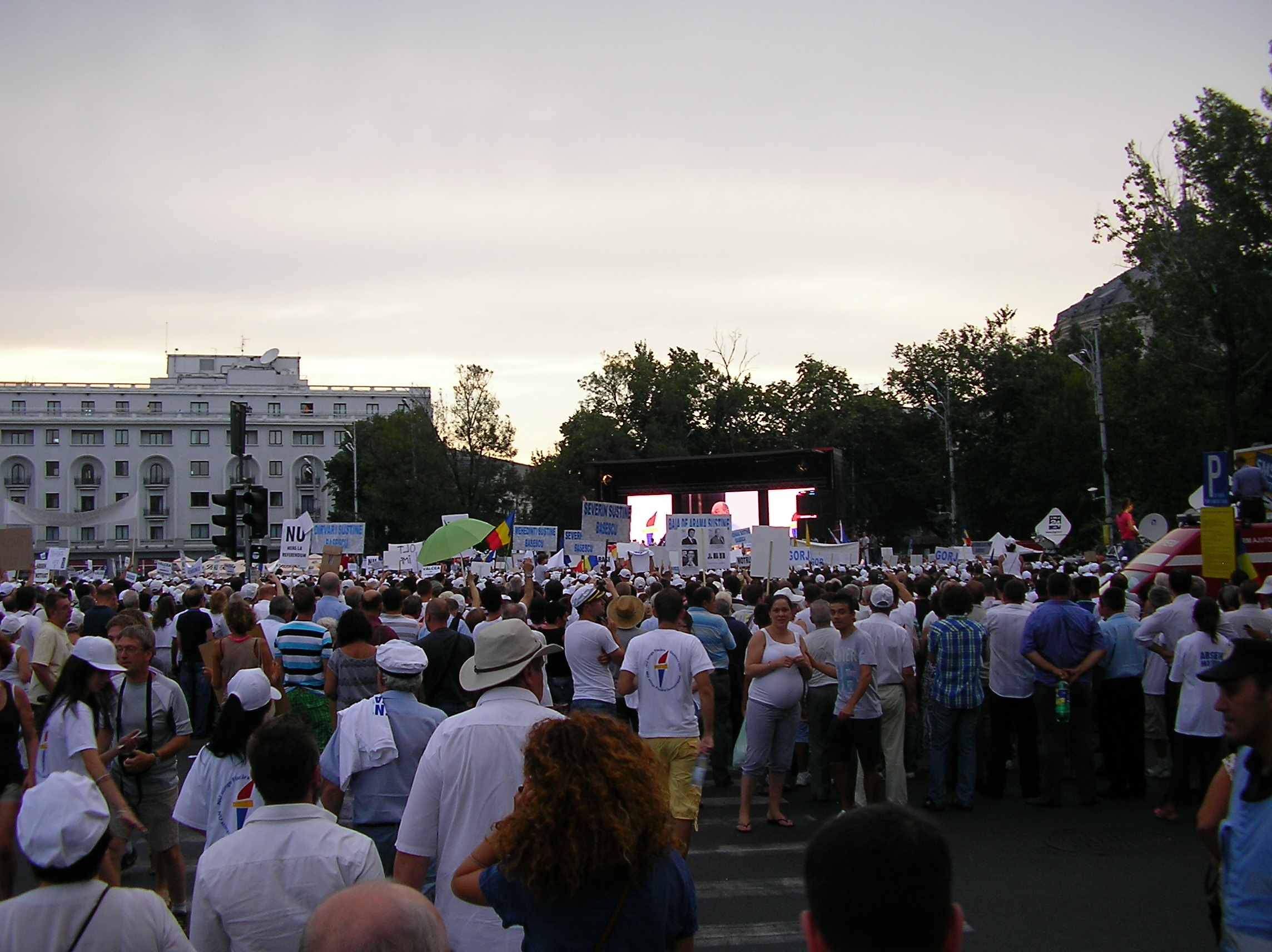
Anti-impeachment protest in Revolution Square, Bucharest, on 26 July 2012

People have started to walk protesting in front of Cotroceni Palace after the decision of the Constitutional Court of Romania to reinstate the suspended president. The demonstrations degenerated in conflicts between the opposing groups: Băsescu's detractors and Băsescu's sympathizers.

The Constitutional Group "Timișoara", coordinated by Lorin Fortuna, considers that Romania, after a politically agitated summer, is not state of law, sovereign and independent. The group proposes an action plan, by that the Romanian people recovers its sovereignty. The plan, called "Justice for Romania!", includes several points, starting from the establishment of a national civic organization, which will organize large popular movements and will result in replacing the current president, unworthy and illegitimate, according to GCT, through a popular action similar to that of 1989.

=== Unpaid wages ===
==== Oltchim S.A. scandal ====
Privatization of Oltchim Râmnicu Vâlcea was requested by Romania's creditors: International Monetary Fund, World Bank and European Commission. The company doesn't have the financial resources to even pay its employees, and discussions with banks, in early-September, with an eye to supporting the company, didn't lead to any results. Chemical plant needs each month, about 40 million to operate. But, because debts, energy distributor Electrica announced the company that, starting on 15 September, it halts supplying electricity. Oltchim Râmnicu Vâlcea has debts of 2.6 billion lei, while its losses in recent years amounted to 1.2 billion lei. According to Remus Vulpescu, former leader of the Office of State Ownership and Privatization in Industry, plant losses amounted to €7-million per month, of which €3-million are just wages. The Romanian state is the majority shareholder, controlling 54.8% of the share capital of the company. The second largest shareholder of Oltchim is the German group PCC, holding a package of 18.31 percent of the shares.

Companies interested in acquiring Oltchim participated on 17 September at an auction, from which it emerged victorious Dan Diaconescu, a domestic politician and owner of OTV television station. Remus Vulpescu announced that, in terms of price, the bidder Dan Diaconescu obtained the highest number of scores for individual purchase on assets at Oltchim. Dan Diaconescu's offering to take over Oltchim is 203 million lei.

On 1 October, Dan Diaconescu brought seven bags of money at the gate of the Ministry of Economy. OTV owner declined to say how much money has in bags, resuming to assert that "very many" and enough to pay Oltchim plant employees' wages until the end of the year. Gendarmes guarding the Ministry of Economy did not allow him the access to the institution with bags of money. So at around 7:10 pm, Dan Diaconescu entered in the Ministry of Economy, but without bags of money. After more than an hour of discussions, Minister of Economy said that the contract for Oltchim privatization wasn't signed. Likewise, Prime Minister Victor Ponta announced that Oltchim privatization was canceled, claiming that auction winner hasn't the money to take over Oltchim, people that he latter has announced that are guarantors doesn't exist.

Ministry of Economy announced, on 3 October, that Office of State Ownership and Privatization in Industry shall notify the Prosecutor regarding the committing by Dan Diaconescu of misdemeanor of deception through repeated by misleading and for acquisition without right of quality of contractor of Oltchim Râmnicu Vâlcea chemical plant. The notification was sent via e-mail.

On 12 November, indignant workers resumed the protests. This time, the manifestations escalated to thrusts between protesters and representatives of the plant. Six employees went on hunger strike, saying that will not give up until will be paid them the remaining wages.

On 14 February 2013, hundreds of Oltchim employees protested in front of the Ministry of Economy headquarters, on the ground that they didn't receive wages for two months. At least 24 employees went on hunger strike. Two of them needed medical care.

==== Brăila demonstrations ====
On 4 October, six employees of CET Brăila went on a hunger strike, the protest being carried out even in the company's office, and other two hundred chanted in the institution courtyard, on the ground that they didn't receive, for the last three months, wages and food stamps. CET Free Trade Union leader, Gheorghiță Pîrlog, said that people have to receive 65 million old lei. Likewise, he called the 5,000 subscribers of CET Brăila for protest in the coming days, whereas the future of centralized heating system is uncertain this winter.

==== Arad–Nădlac motorway protests and Romstrade scandal ====
The company Romstrade entered in a scandal, after its administrator, Nelu Iordache, changed, without observing the legal provisions, the destination of 25,000,000 lei, money encashed for the design and execution of the first section of Arad–Nădlac motorway, work being funded at least 85% from the Cohesion Fund of the European Union. The greater part, namely 9,724,780 lei of the amount intended for motorway construction, was to be used to pay debts of companies in which he was directly concerned, payments made under contracts that are not related to performance of the contract for motorway. Another 9,861,000 lei were withdrawn in cash for the acquisition of land in the commune of Adunații-Copăceni, based on fictitious sales and purchase pre-contracts. In this way, the Bucharest Court Magistrates decided the arresting for 29 days of businessman Nelu Iordache.

On 16 November, dozens of mortar mixers and excavators blocked the site on section 1 of A1 motorway, in protest against unpaid wages from the company Romstrade. About 100 workers got into hunger strike and threatened that they would not resume the work until four months' outstanding salaries were paid. On 6 December, dozens of workers outraged that they had not received the money for salaries protested in front of the Romstrade headquarters in Bucharest.

==== CFR lockout ====
Some of the CFR Călători employees triggered a spontaneous strike, on 16 January 2013, dissatisfied that they have not received full wages for December 2012. 138 trains were blocked in six big railway stations in the country.

=== Indifference of authorities ===
On 10 September, two men came, in front of Sector 5 City Hall, with a gas tank and threatened to self-immolate, dissatisfied that they were not received in audience by Mayor Marian Vanghelie. They were quickly immobilized by local police. One of the protesters was taken to the Police for hearings. The other one accused cardiac pains and received medical care, but he died in Colţea Hospital, although medical crews tried to resuscitate him.

On 30 October, a man armed with an ax and a knife threatened more persons in a post office in Drumul Taberei neighborhood (Bucharest), not leaving them to leave the unit. The man was restrained by policemen, this being led to Bucharest Police Station for hearings. A post office employee was taken in shock at Bucharest Emergency University Hospital. Both the perpetrator and his accomplice received arrest warrants for 29 days. The man that entered armed in the post office demanded the "annexation of Romania to Moldova" and "fees that in Italy", according to sources close to the investigation.

On 18 November, dozens of young people protested in University Square against citizens homophobic attacks and indifference of the authorities in these situations. The protest included a die-in and comes shortly after many participants in the spectacle "From the Gay History Tabs" were attacked in Bucharest.

=== Farmers ===
About two thousand farmers and agricultural producers protested, on 7 November, in front of the Government. They reclaimed the indifference with which agriculture is treated by state representatives and demanded the resignation of the Minister of Agriculture, Daniel Constantin. The protest degenerated in conflicts between protesters and law enforcement. Protesters threw fences in policemen. Gendarmes dispersed the crowd with tear gas. The road traffic was halted tens of minutes in the area. An ambulance was requested at the meeting of farmers in Victory Square to provide medical care for a protester which was attacked during the gendarmes intervention. At least four people were arrested.

Around 300 farmers protested, on 28 December, and organized a march with tractors and agricultural machinery on Nădlac city streets, being dissatisfied that, because Nădlac-Arad motorway section, they can not reach much of the agricultural land. At the protest were brought over 150 tractors, combines and agricultural machinery, and protesters staged a "funeral" of local agriculture.

== See also ==
- List of protests in the 21st century
