= Gheorghe Cantacuzino =

Gheorghe Cantacuzino may refer to several members of the Cantacuzino family:

- Gheorghe Grigore Cantacuzino (1833–1913), twice prime minister of Romania
- Grigore Gheorghe Cantacuzino (1872–1930), mayor of Bucharest
- Gheorghe Cantacuzino-Grănicerul, soldier and fascist politician
- Gheorghe I. Cantacuzino (born 1937), historian
- George Matei Cantacuzino (1899–1960), Romanian architect, painter and essayist
