= Șerban Vodă Inn =

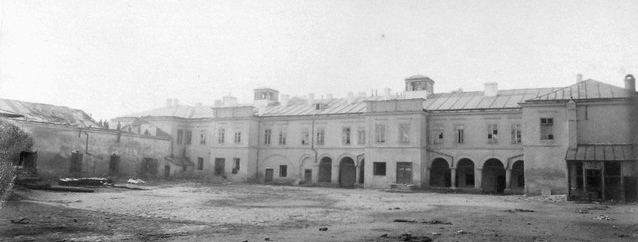
Inner courtyard in 1880

The Șerban Vodă Inn was an inn in Bucharest, Romania, founded by Hospodar Șerban Cantacuzino in the 1680s, it was finally opened for business in 1685. Administered by the Cotroceni Monastery, the inn was, for much of its history, the most important in Bucharest.

Like other inns in Bucharest, it was affected by the advent of modern hotels: it was closed around the mid-19th century and it was demolished in 1882 to make way for the current headquarters of the National Bank of Romania.

== Description ==
While this was not the first inn of Bucharest (such as the older Saint George's Inn), it was on a larger scale than anything Bucharest ever had.

The inn served as both warehouses and living quarters for merchants and it may have been inspired by the fondachi of Venice (such as Fondaco dei Tedeschi and the Fondaco dei Turchi). However Șerban had never been to Venice and his brother, stolnic Constantin Cantacuzino, who studied in Padova, was not in friendly terms with Șerban. Nevertheless, such inns were not unique to Venice and Șerban Cantacuzino may have seen them in Constantinople.

It was surrounded by thick walls just like some of the monasteries of Bucharest. Archeological digs around the area showed that the walls had a thickness of one meter, being made out of well-burnt narrow bricks.

== History ==
=== Planning ===
Șerban Cantacuzino had planned to build an inn since he was a postelnic in the diwan of Grigore Ghica, writing this in a chrysobull (hrisov) of one of his donations to Cotroceni Monastery.

Between 1666 and 1680, Cantacuzino buys a number of 39 properties (empty lots and shops) in the Greeks' Quarter (Mahalaua Grecilor). The lot had an area of 7510 m², having a 105-meter front on Lipscani street and a 70-meter front on Ulița Mare (today Smârdan).

This area of Bucharest was well-chosen for an inn, as the nearby the Târgul de Sus (Upper Market) began to develop during this period, being also close to the shops of some richest merchants of the time, such as Pano Pepano or Ghionea Mustață.

On 8 January 1683 Șerban Cantacuzino donated the lot and shops to the Cotroceni Monastery (which he began building 4 years earlier).

=== Construction ===
It is assumed that the inn was built by the same craftsmen as the Monastery of Cotroceni, the building of which finished in 1683, so its construction began during the summer of 1683.

Within three years, in 1685, the inn was ready to allow merchants and tenants to settle in. The guest rooms, shops, cellars and warehouses were ready, but certain annex buildings (such as the stables, the hay storage buildings and the kitchens) were not ready even by 1688 when Șerban Cantacuzino died.

It seems that the reason why it was left unfinished was financial: Cantacuzino spent much on the Cotroceni Monastery and also on the Siege of Vienna (1683), in which he participated on the Ottoman side.

=== Decay and demolition ===
After 1850, the inn was abandoned and it began to deteriorate. The inn, with its fortress walls became anachronic and was left outside the development of the commercial city centre. In 1882, it was demolished and in its place the National Bank of Romania built its new headquarters.
