= Filotti =

Filotti is a Romanian surname. Notable people with the surname include:

- Eugen Filotti (1896–1975), Romanian diplomat, journalist and writer
- Andrei Filotti (1930-2024), Romanian hydropower engineer.
- Ion Filotti Cantacuzino (1908–1975), Romanian film producer, film producer, writer and psychiatrist
- Maria Filotti (1883–1956), Romanian actress
  - Maria Filotti Theatre, theatre in Brăila, Romania
