= Scărlătești =

Scărlăteşti may refer to several villages in Romania:

- Scărlăteşti, a village in Cireşu Commune, Brăila County
- Scărlăteşti, a village in Largu Commune, Buzău County
