= Oltchim Râmnicu Vâlcea =

May refer to:

- Oltchim S.A. - a chemical company in Romania
- CS Oltchim Râmnicu Vâlcea - a women's handball club
- FC Oltchim Râmnicu Vâlcea - a defunct men's football club, dissolved in 2012.
