= Șerban Cantacuzino (actor) =

Romanian prince and actor

- Prince
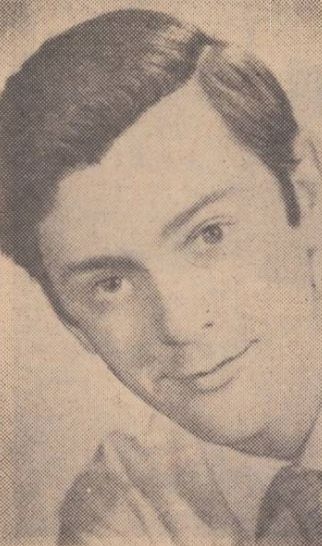
- Full name: Șerban Constantin Cantacuzino
- Born: February 4, 1941; Bucharest, Romania
- Died: July 4, 2011 (aged 70); Paris, France
- Buried: Bellu Orthodox Cemetery, Bucharest
- Father: Ion Filotti Cantacuzino
- Occupation: Actor

Prince Șerban Constantin Cantacuzino (Romanian pronunciation: [ʃerˈbaŋ konstanˈtiŋ kantakuziˈno]; 4 February 1941 – 4 July 2011) was a Romanian prince and actor, who appeared in more than a dozen television, film, and musical roles during his career. He was a descendant of Șerban Cantacuzino, the Prince of Wallachia from 1678 to 1688.

Born into Romanian nobility, specifically the Cantacuzino family, Cantacuzino was a descendant of Șerban Cantacuzino, the Prince of Wallachia who supported the Ottoman Empire at the Battle of Vienna, published the Cantacuzino Bible and introduced maize to present-day Romania. His father, Ion Filotti Cantacuzino, was a screenwriter, doctor, film critic, film director, and producer.

Cantacuzino made his stage acting debut when he was 11 years old at the National Theatre Bucharest in the production, The Prince and the Beggar, opposite his grandmother, actress Maria Filotti. He starred in Richard III as Prince Edward at the Army Theater in Constanța in 1963. Cantacuzino co-starred with George Vraca in Richard III.

Cantacuzino moved to Paris, France, in 1990. He died in Paris on 4 July 2011, at the age of 70. His funeral was held at the Bellu Orthodox Cemetery in Bucharest, Romania.

== Filmography ==
| Year | Title | Role | Notes |
|---|---|---|---|
| 1964 | Străinul | Lucian Varga as a student | |
| 1965 | Gaudeamus igitur | Emil Șerban | |
| 1967 | Sept hommes et une garce | Silvio | |
| 1974 | Frații Jderi | | |
| 1975 | Stephen the Great - Vaslui 1475 | | |
| 1977 | Războiul independenței | Mihail Kogălniceanu's chief of staff | |
| 1977 | Pentru patrie | | |
| 1984 | Mușchetarii în vacanță | Matei's father | |
| 1988 | Secretul armei secrete | | |
| 1989 | Those Who Pay With Their Lives | | Final film role |
