= Teodor Nițulescu =

Romanian politician (born 1959)

Prefect of Teleorman County
- In office 1 October 2009 – 17 April 2012
- Succeeded by: Zorinel Niculcea
- In office January 2001 – December 2004

Personal details
- Born: 4 December 1959 (age 66) Roșiorii de Vede, Teleorman County, People's Republic of Romania
- Party: Romanian Ecologist Party (since 2020)
- Other political affiliations: Social Democracy Party of Romania (1995—1997, 2000—2001); Democratic Party (1997—1999); Social Democratic Party (2000—2006, 2006—2007); Greater Romania Party (2006); Conservative Party (2007—2008); Democratic-Liberal Party (2008—2014); National Liberal Party (2014—2015); National Democratic Party (2015—2016); People's Movement Party (2020)
- Education: Politehnica University of Bucharest
- Profession: Engineer

Teodor Nițulescu (born 4 December 1959) is a Romanian politician of the Romanian Ecologist Party. He served as prefect of Teleorman County from 2001 to 2004 and from 2009 to 2012. From 2004 to 2008, he was a member of the Chamber of Deputies. From 1996 to 2001, he served as mayor of Alexandria.

== Political career ==
Teodor Nițulescu was born on 4 December 1959 in Roșiorii de Vede, but he grew up in Stejaru. He graduated from the Politehnica University of Bucharest in 1984, specializing in precision mechanics. He then worked as an engineer in Alexandria.

Nițulescu joined the Social Democracy Party of Romania (PDSR) in 1995 and was elected as mayor of Alexandria in 1996. He then left the PDSR for the Democratic Party (PD), but he joined the Social Democrats again before the 2000 election, which he won with 85% of the votes. He then became the leader of the Teleorman branch of the PDSR (PSD from 2001). He resigned from his position as mayor of Alexandria in 2001, to become the prefect of the Teleorman County. During this time, he was considered a close collaborator of Prime Minister Adrian Nastase.

Nițulescu was elected in the Chamber of Deputies in 2004. He left the Social Democrats in June 2006 for the Greater Romania Party (PRM), becoming its vicepresident, but he rejoined the PSD in October that year. He left again the Social Democrats for the Conservative Party (PC) in September 2007, running for mayor of Alexandria with PC support at the 2008 Romanian local election. He then joined the Democratic Liberal Party (PDL), becoming once again the prefect of the Teleorman County. He became the president of the Teleorman County branch of PDL in 2013. In 2014, after PDL's merger with the National Liberal Party (PNL), Teodor Nițulescu became the co-president of the Teleorman branch of PNL. He was dismissed from this position on 4 February 2015 by Vasile Blaga and replaced with Costel Barbu. He then joined the National Democratic Party, but left the party after it merged with the National Liberals.

Nițulescu returned to politics in 2020, when he joined the Romanian Ecologist Party, becoming its president of the Teleorman County branch, as well as its national vicepresident. He ran for President of the Teleorman County Council, but won only 2.97% of the votes.

In November 2024 he announced his return to politics, supporting independent Calin Georgescu in the presidential elections. On December 17, 2024, Nițulescu announced through a video on TikTok that he would run for president if Georgescu was not allowed to do so, after he talks to him.

== Controversies ==
Due to the fact that he changed several parties during his political career, Nitulescu is considered a political party-switcher.

The newspaper Curentul reported in 2003 that, after the local newspaper Gazeta de Teleorman revealed the businesses with the state of Nitulescu, the, he sent out thugs to assault the 2 journalists who wrote the article. Due to his large influence in the county, he was considered Teleorman's political boss.

Constantin Amarie, the brother of the PNA head at that time, Ioan Amarie, became a deputy from PSD Teleorman, with the support of Nitulescu. Both signed a letter of support for Traian Basescu in 2007, in the context of his impeachment, and later moved to the PDL.

Nicolae Mirzan, former security officer in Zimnicea, and later adviser in the cabinet of Teodor Nitulescu, then prefect of PDSR/PSD, stated in TV Show that he would have told him that „now we can steal anything”, there is even a free hand in Bucharest (that is, from the government of Adrian Nastase) in this regard.

In 2011, Teodor Nitulescu, this time prefect of the PDL, distinguished himself by a fight with a team of journalists coming to Teleorman prefecture.

On January 17, 2012, in Alexandria, Teleorman county, hundreds of people, including unemployed citizens, pensioners, civil servants and trade unionists protestedin front of the House of Culture. They were joined by dozens of other people from Rosiori de Vede who arrived by bus. In particular, in addition to Basescu's resignation, people also demanded the resignation of Teleorman County prefect Teodor Nitulescu.

In 2014, Nitulescu was suspected of abuse of office, conflict of interest and financial operations, as acts of commerce, incompatible with his function, duty or task. According to some documents of the investigators, Teodor Nitulescu, as prefect of Teleorman County in 2009-2012, exercised influence actions for the Association of Hunters and Sportive Fishermen (AVPS) See, where he was president, obtain the right to manage the hunting fauna from certain hunting funds located in Teleorman. Nitulescu was also suspected of intervening in the leadership of the Teleorman Sanitary Veterinary and Food Safety Directorate in order to stop checks at SC Comixt or influence the conclusions of the controls.

In 2016, Teodor Nitulescu was accused of assaulting a woman at his company headquarters in Rosiorii de Vede. The incident started when Nitulescu was asked to explain a land he leased.
