= On the Waves of Happiness =

1920 film

- Directed by: Dolly A. Szigethy
- Written by: Dumitru Sillo
- Starring: Lya De Putti; Maria Filotti; Ian Manolescu
- Release date: 1920
- Country: Romania
- Languages: Silent; Romanian intertitles

On the Waves of Happiness (Romanian: Pe valurile fericirii) is a 1920 Romanian silent film directed by Dolly A. Szigethy and starring Lya De Putti, Maria Filotti, and Ian Manolescu.

== Cast ==
- Lya De Putti
- Maria Filotti
- Ian Manolescu
- Gheorghe Storin
- Tantzi Cutava-Barozzi
- Alexandre Mihalesco
- Petre Bulandra
- Gina Petrescu
- Mimi Bulandra

== Bibliography ==
- Bock, Hans-Michael & Bergfelder, Tim. The Concise CineGraph. Encyclopedia of German Cinema. Berghahn Books, 2009.
