= Cireșu, Brăila =

Cireșu
- Commune
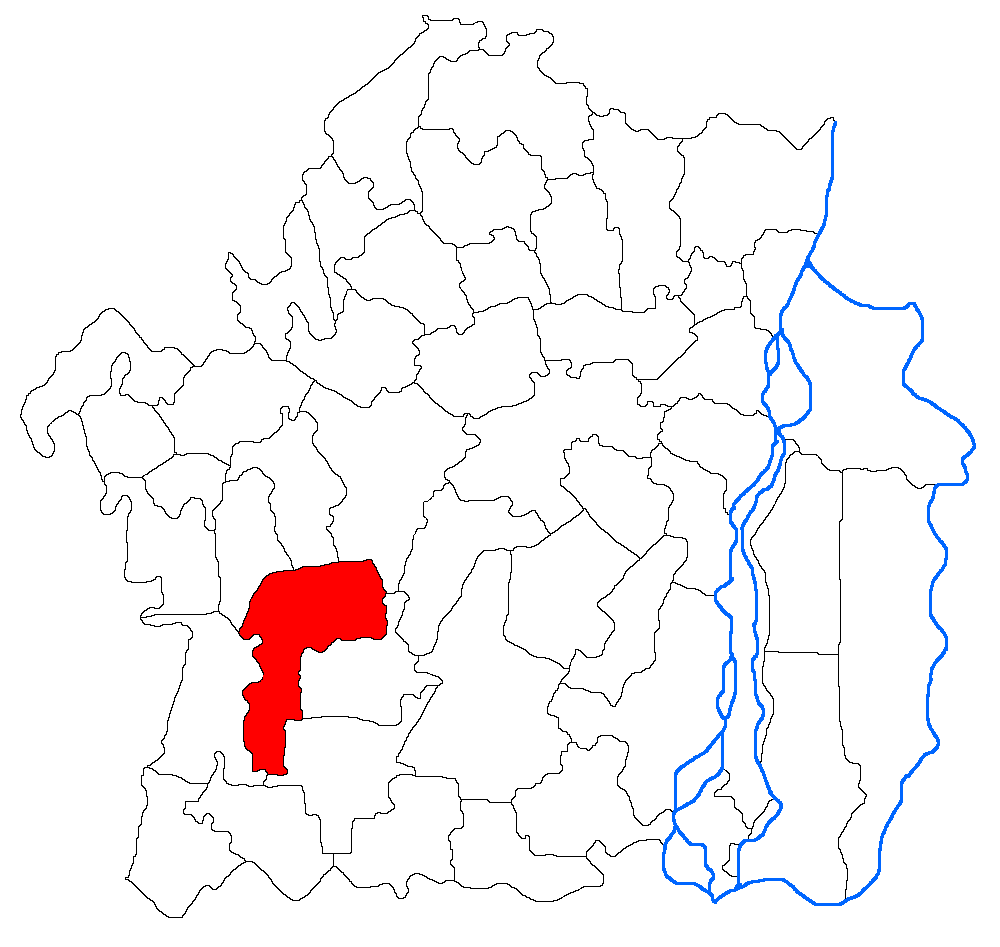
- Location in Brăila County

- Location in Romania
- Coordinates: 45°0′2″N 27°26′54″E
- Country: Romania
- County: Brăila
- Subdivisions: Batogu, Cireșu, Ionești, Scărlătești, Vultureni
- Population (2021-12-01): 2,467
- Time zone: EET/EEST (UTC+2/+3)
- Vehicle reg.: BR

Cireşu is a commune located in Brăila County, Muntenia, Romania. It is composed of five villages: Batogu, Cireșu, Ionești, Scărlătești and Vultureni.

== Batogu ==
Batogu, now a village of Cireșu, was a separate commune until 1968. The Batogu manor, built in the 1850s, was the seat of the Filotti family until 1947. Maria Filotti was born here in 1883.
