= Ion Filotti Cantacuzino =

Romanian film producer, writer and psychiatrist

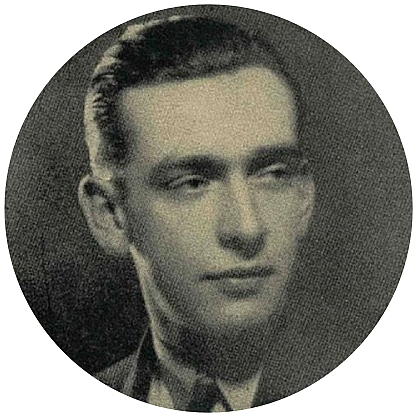
- Cantacuzino in 1935
- Born: Ion Şerban Filotti Cantacuzino; 7 November 1908; Bucharest, Romania
- Died: 27 August 1975 (aged 66); Bucharest, Romania
- Resting place: Bellu Cemetery
- Education: University of Paris
- Occupations: Film producer, writer, psychiatrist
- Spouse: Elena Warthiadi
- Children: Gheorghe I. Cantacuzino; Şerban Cantacuzino
- Parent: Maria Filotti

Ion Filotti Cantacuzino or Ion I. Cantacuzino (7 November 1908 in Bucharest, Romania – 27 August 1975 in Bucharest, Romania) was a Romanian film producer, writer and psychiatrist.

== Biographic data ==
Ion Filotti Cantacuzino, born in Bucharest on 7 November 1908, was the son of prince Ion Cantacuzino and of actress Maria Filotti. He studied medicine at the Carol Davila University of Medicine and Pharmacy and philosophy at the University of Bucharesthe graduated from the University of Paris' Faculty of Sciences and Faculty of Medicine,

He married Elena Warthiadi and had two sons: historian Gheorghe I. Cantacuzino and actor Şerban Cantacuzino.

== Activity as writer and film critic ==
Cantacuzino's first publication is the short story "De Amore Paradox" published first in 1929 in the magazine "Excelsior". It was reprinted as a separate volume in 1935 with 18 illustrations by W. Siegfried. Interested in cinematography he started his activity as film critic in 1931 when he was appointed by "Radio România" and started the first broadcast critics in Romania. He also contributed with film critics to various Romanian magazines.

In 1934 he also wrote his first screenplay for a documentary film "Romania" – directed by Paul Călinescu and Jean Mihail.

In 1935 he published his first volume about films: "The Fairytale factory" (Romanian: Uzina de basme) The same year, he published his only play "Dri-dri" which was awarded the prize of the "Society of Romanian Dramaturgists" (Societatea Autorilor Dramatici Români) for one-act plays.

== Film producer and director ==
In 1941, Cantacuzino was appointed director of the National Office of Cinematography, which had been created in the late 1930s. The main activity of the Office was to release newsreels about the World War II. Besides coordinating the activity of the office, Cantacuzino wrote the screenplays, and directed and produced documentaries having cultural subjects: "The Peleş Castle" (Castelul Peleş) – 1941 or "Old Customs" (Datini din străbuni) – 1942 or related to the war: "Romania in war against bolshevism" (România în lupta contra bolșevismului) – 1941, "Our sacred war" (Războiul nostru sfânt) – 1942, "We" (Noi) – 1942.

In 1943 Cantacuzino produced the film "Stormy Night" (O noapte furtunoasă), a comedy based on a play by Ion Luca Caragiale directed by Jean Georgescu. He then created the Romanian-Italian film production and distribution company Cineromit. The first coproduction was "Odessa in Flames" (Odessa in fiamme) directed by Carmine Gallone on a screenplay by Gherardo Gherardi and Nicolae Kiriţescu. The next production of "Cineromit" was scheduled to be produced in Romania. A second film, "The white squadron" (Squadriglia bianca), directed by Romanian director Ion Sava was released in 1944. The same year, Ion Cantacuzino, as producer, selected Jean Georgescu to direct the film "A Winter Night's Dream" (Visul unei nopți de iarnă) based on a play by Tudor Mușatescu. Due to the war, the film could be completed only in 1945. Another project which Ion Cantacuzino was negotiating with the Italians was a historical drama on the life of Stephen the Great, based on a screenplay by Camil Petrescu, starring Amedeo Nazzari and Alida Valli. This project had to be abandoned due to the war.

Cantacuzino was also planning to create, in cooperation with the Italians, a center for the production of feature films in Romania. The plans for the construction of the center had been designed by architect Octav Doicescu and the Italian government had promised to provide the equipment. The project could not be finalized due to the war.

== Activity after 1945 ==
After the rise to power of the communist regime in Romania, Cantacuzino was blacklisted, because of both his aristocratic background and his antisoviet attitude during the war years. He was arrested for a short time. After his release, he reverted to his second profession and worked for the rest of his life as a psychiatrist at the "Brâncovenesc Hospital" in Bucharest.

He did not give up his activities related to the entertainment industry. He translatated various plays for theatrical performances such as Eduardo De Filippo's Filumena Marturano and George Bernard Shaw's Heartbreak House.

In the 1960s, Cantacuzino was able to publish again. He finalized the volumes of memoirs that his mother had not been able to complete before her death. He also wrote a book on the history of Romanian cinema "Moments from the past of Romanian film" (1965).

== Death ==
Cantacuzino died on 27 August 1975. He is interred at Bellu Cemetery in Bucharest.
