= Maria Filotti Theatre =

Coordinates: 45°16′18.21″N 27°58′24.37″E

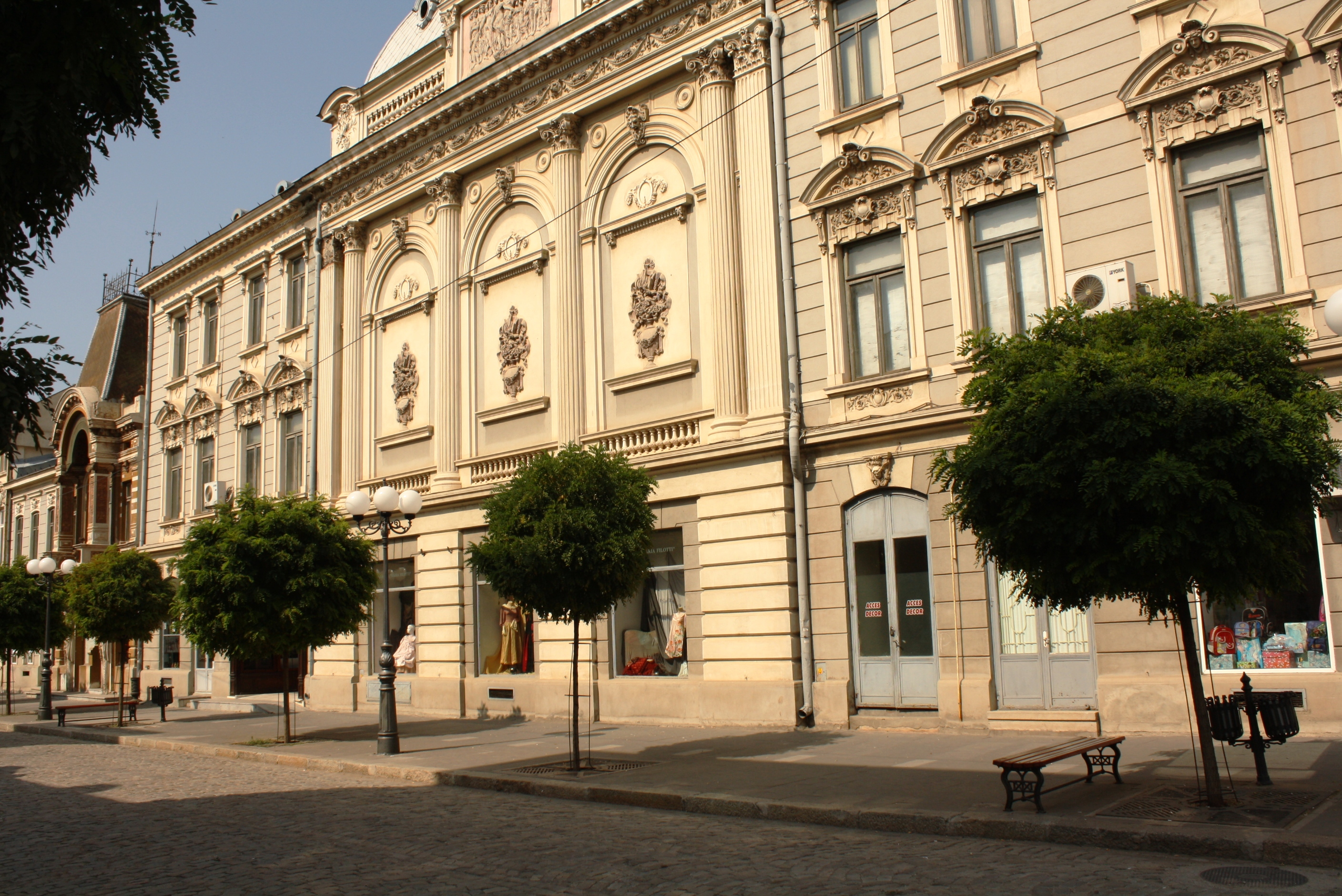
The Maria Filotti Theatre in Brăila

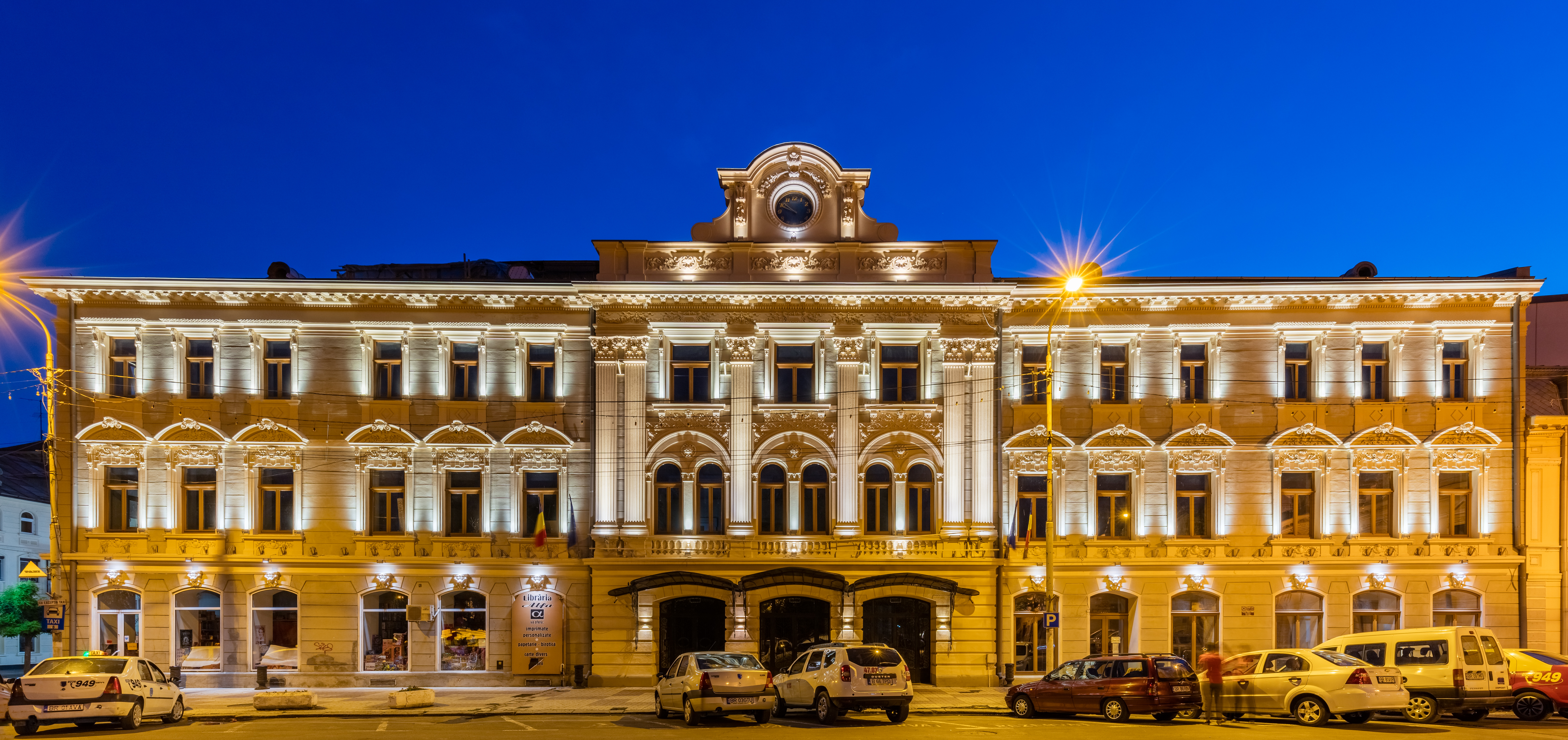
Full view of the theatre

The Maria Filotti is a theatre in Brăila, Romania.

== History ==
The theatre was built in 1896 as "Teatrul Rally". In 1919, it was renamed "Teatrul Comunal" ("The Communal Theatre"), in 1949, "Teatrul de Stat Brăila – Galați" ("The State Theater of Brăila – Galați"), and in 1969, it acquired its present name, in honour of the Romanian actress, Maria Filotti (1883–1956).

== Description ==
The theatre has 369 seats.
