= Maria Filotti =

Romanian actress (1883–1956)

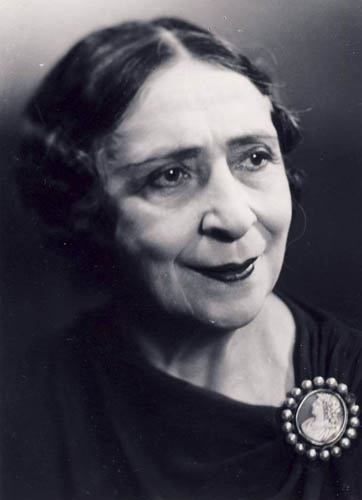
Maria Filotti

Maria Filotti (9 October 1883, Batogu, Brăila County, Romania – 5 November 1956, Bucharest, Romania) was a Romanian actress . She was described as one of the "prestigious actors of the great realistic school" and the "directress" of a theater "that made an important contribution to transmitting the experience from one generation to the next."

Filotti was the grandmother of Romanian actor, Șerban Cantacuzino. Cantacuzino made his acting debut opposite Filotti in The Prince and the Pauper at the National Theatre Bucharest when he was eleven years old.

== Legacy ==
The Maria Filotti Theatre in Brăila is named for Filotti.

== Stage appearances ==
- Gioconda in La Gioconda by Gabriele D'Annunzio (1904–1905)
- Silvia in Suprema forță by Haralamb Lecca (1904–1905)
- Nenela in Come le foglie by Giuseppe Giacosa (1905–1906)
- Enriqueta in El loco Dios by José Echegaray (1905–1906)
- Catherine de Septmonts in L'étrangère by Alexandre Dumas fils (1906–1907, Iași)
- Berta in Victims of the Law by Landray (1906–1907, Iași)
- Clara Tardini in Jucătorii de cărți by Haralamb Lecca (1906–1907, Iași)
- Henriette in Cele două orfeline by Adolphe d'Ennery and Eugène Cormon (1906–1907, Iași)
- Germaine Lechat in Les affaires sont les affaires by Octave Mirbeau (1906–1907, Iaşi)
- Nelly Rozier in Nelly Rozier by Maurice Hennequin and Paul Bilhaud (1906–1907, Iași)
- Thomry in La Martyre by Jean Richepin (1906–1907, Iași)
- Elena de Bréchebel in La rafale (Whirlwind) by Henri Bernstein (1906–1907, Iași)
- Elissa in Rahab by Rudolf von Gottschall (1906–1907, Iași)
- Lady Milford in Kabale und Liebe (Intrigue and Love) by Friedrich Schiller (1906–1907)
- Maria in Magda (Heimat) by Hermann Sudermann (1906–1907)
- Toinetta in Eva by Richard Voss (1906–1907)
- Neera in Fântâna Blanduziei by Vasile Alecsandri (1907–1908, Bucharest)
- Vidra in Răzvan și Vidra by Bogdan Petriceicu Hasdeu (1907–1908)
- Eglea in Dragoste cu toane by Goethe (1907–1908)
- Corina in Ovidiu by Vasile Alecsandri (1907–1908)
- Zoe in O scrisoare pierdută by Ion Luca Caragiale (1922–1923)
- Countess Almaviva in Nunta lui Figaro by Beaumarchais (1922–1923)
- Hedda Gabler in Hedda Gabler by Henrik Ibsen
- Queen Elisabeth in Maria Stuart (Mary Stuart) by Friedrich Schiller (1923–1924)
- Irina in Chaika (The Seagull) by Anton Chekhov (1923–1924)
- Clotilde in Pariziana by Henry Becque (1929)
- Zoe in Gaițele by Alexandru Kirițescu (1949–1950, Bucharest)
- Melania in Yegor Bulychov and Others by Maxim Gorki (1950–1951, Bucharest)
- Adela in Citadela sfărâmată by Horia Lovinescu (1954–1955, Bucharest)

== Filmography ==
- Înșir-te mărgărite (1912)
- Independența României (1912)
- On the Waves of Happiness (1920)
- Visul unui nopți de iarnă (1946)
- Citadela sfărâmată (1956)

== Works ==
- Maria Filotti - Am ales teatrul - Editura pentru literatură, 1961

== See also ==
- Filotti
