= Gheorghe I. Cantacuzino =

Romanian historian and archaeologist (1937–2019)

Gheorghe Cantacuzino
- Born: 13 September 1937; Bucharest, Romania
- Died: 26 July 2019; Craiova, Romania
- Occupation(s): Historian, Archeologist, Museologist
- Spouse(s): i.-Călina Brătăşanu ii.- Maria Ioana Popescu iii.-Cristina Colfescu
- Parent(s): Ion Filotti Cantacuzino; Elena Warthiadi

Gheorghe I. Cantacuzino (born 1937, Bucharest-2019) was a Romanian historian and archeologist.

== Education ==
Gheorghe I. Cantacuzino studied at the Sfântul Sava High School, graduating in 1954. Thereafter he attended the courses of the Faculty of History at the University of Bucharest, specializing in history of the antiquity and archeology. In 1977 he got his doctor's degree at the Institute of Archeology of Bucharest.

== Professional activity ==
Gheorghe Cantacuzino started his professional activity as museologist in Tulcea, where he worked from 1959 to 1961. He then transferred to the Nicolae Minovici Folk Art Museum where he also held a position of museologist from 1961 to 1963.

In 1963 he got a position of archeologist at the Direction of Historical Monuments (renamed "Direction of the National Cultural Heritage" in 1974) where he worked till 1978. He then held the position of chief museologist at the National Museum of Romanian History till 1990.

The change of regime in Romania of 1989 gave George Cantacuzino the opportunity of a breakthrough. In 1990 he was appointed inspector at the "Direction of Historical Monuments, Aggregates and Sites" and in 1994 promoted to advisor of the Direction of Historical Monuments. Finally in 1996 he secured a position of scientific researcher at the "Vasile Pârvan" Institute of Archeology of the Romanian Academy.

Gheorghe Cantacuzino is also vice president of the Commission for the History of Cities in Romania (Comisia de Istorie an Oraşelor din România – CIOR) of the Romanian Academy.

In 2001 he received the Nicolae Iorga prize of the Romanian Academy.

== Research ==
Gheorghe Cantacuzino participated in archeological excavations in several sites such as:

- Bucharest – Mărcuța monastery
- Brădet Hermitage, Argeș County
- Moldovița Monastery Suceava County – ruins of the old church
- Humor Monastery, Suceava County
- Târgoviște: Princely court, Sf. Vineri church
- Stelea Monastery, Târgoviște
- Poenari Castle, Argeș County
- Vodița Monastery, Mehedinți County
- Tismana Monastery, Gorj County
- Șemlacul Mic, Timiș, Săraca Monastery
- Putna Monastery, Suceava county
- Războieni, Neamț – Ștefan cel Mare, church
- Sânpetru, Hunedoara – Sf. Gheorghe church
- Turnu Citadel, Turnu Măgurele
- Leșnic, Hunedoara – Sf. Nicolae church
- Câmpulung-Muscel – old princely court

== Publications ==
=== Books ===
- Cetăți medievale din Țara Românească în secolele XIII – XIV, București, Editura Enciclopedică, 2001, 296 p. cu ilustr.;
- Câmpulung. Vechi monumente și biserici, București, Editura Vremea, 2002, 112 p. cu ilustrații.
- Mănăstirea Tismana București, Editura Vremea, 2004
- Atlas istoric al orașelor din România. Seria B. Țara Românească. Fascicula 1. Târgoviște București, Editura Enciclopedică, 2006.
