= Cotroceni Palace =

Official residence of the President of Romania

Cotroceni Palace Palatul Cotroceni
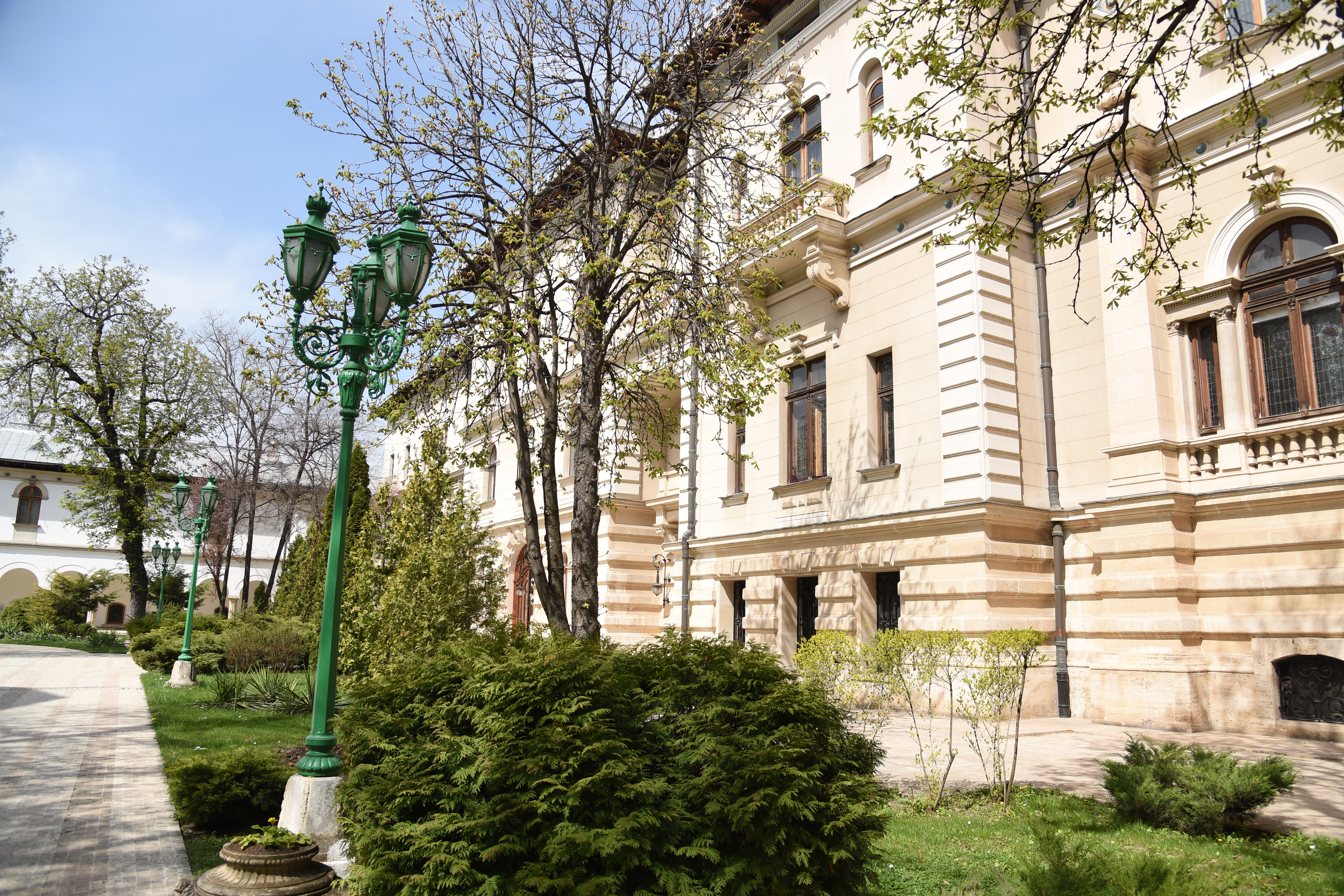
- Interactive map of the Cotroceni Palace; Palatul Cotroceni area

General information
- Architectural style: Brâncovenesc style
- Location: Boulevard Geniului 1-3, Sector 6, Bucharest, Romania
- Coordinates: 44°26′02″N 26°03′43″E
- Current tenants: Nicușor Dan, President of Romania
- Construction started: 1893
- Completed: 1895
- Cost: 1,700,000 gold Romanian lei

Design and construction
- Architects: Paul Gottereau; Grigore Cerchez (the northern wing); Nicolae Vlădescu (the new wing)

Cotroceni Palace (Romanian: Palatul Cotroceni) is the official residence of the President of Romania. It is located at Bulevardul Geniului, nr. 1, in Bucharest, Romania. The palace also houses the National Cotroceni Museum.

== History ==
=== The Cotroceni Monastery (1679–1682) ===
In 1679, a monastery was built by Șerban Cantacuzino on Cotroceni Hill in the first year of his rule on the place of an old wooden hermitage. The plans of this new monastery kept many of the traditional architectural elements found in the principalities of Romania at the time. The Cotroceni monastery was completed in 1682, and has since been visited frequently by many pilgrims and documented in various Chronicles.

=== The royal palace (1883–1895) ===
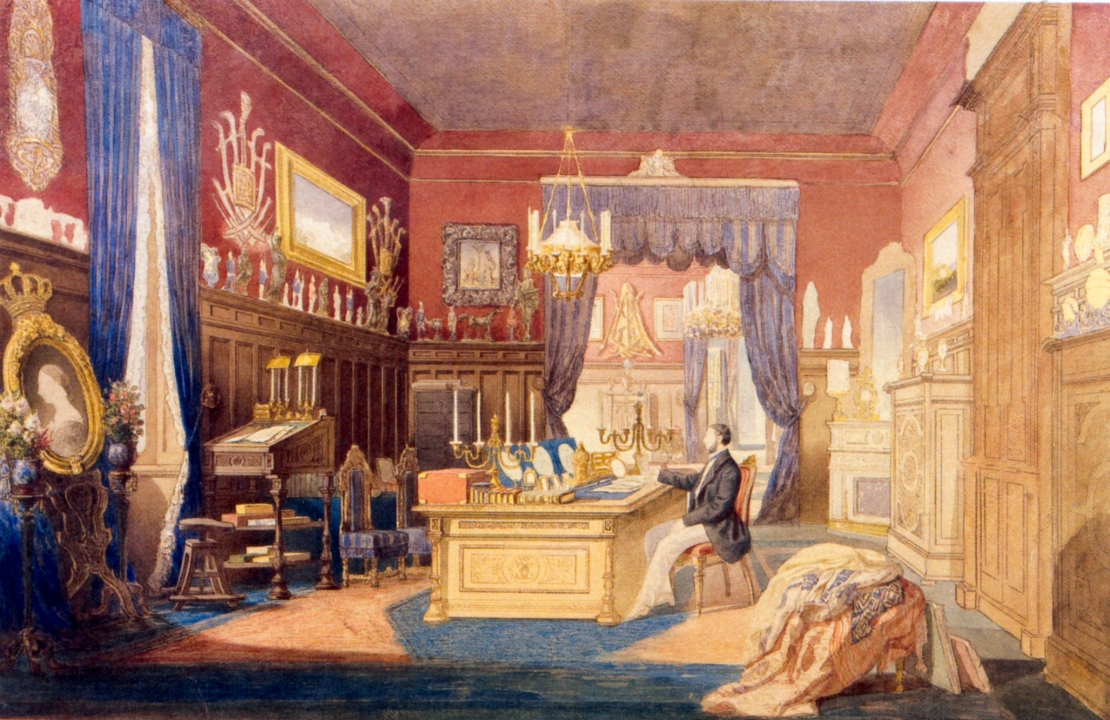
Painting by Carol Szathmari of Carol I sitting at his desk

Cotroceni Hill was also the place of residence of many of Romania's rulers for a time until 1883, when King Carol I of Romania received the residences and ordered them demolished with plans to build a much larger edifice in their stead which would serve to house the future heirs to his throne.

Construction of this new royal palace was commissioned to begin in the year 1893, the project being placed under the direction of French architect Paul Gottereau.

=== The north wing (1915–1926) ===
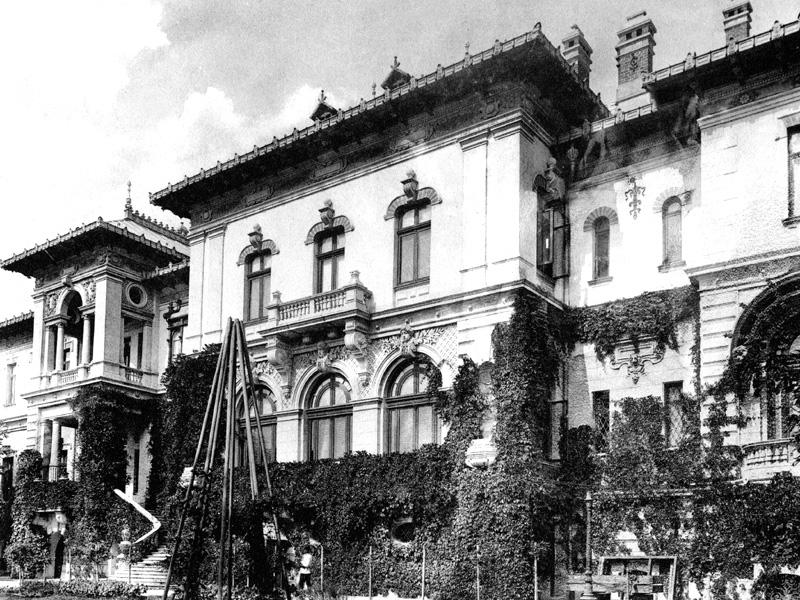
Early 1900s photograph of Cotroceni Palace, taken by Romanian photographer Alexander Antoniu

During the rule of King Ferdinand I and Queen Marie, further improvements were made to the royal palace. At the request of Queen Marie, the north wing of the palace was completed with the space that would be used to house the maids of honor and adjutants in duplex apartments of sorts. A gymnastics hall at the semi-basement was also built, taking up the space where it is assumed that a chapel would have resided on the ground floor. In October 1915, the space was refitted to accommodate central heating.

In 1925, architect Grigore Cerchez began his work on the Cotroceni Palace by adding a living room with a gazebo on the first floor. On the second floor, he added a small terrace on the northern face along with an additional gazebo. Cerchez continued to work on the two adjacent salons on the first floor of the north wing, as well as the Grand Reception Hall that distinguished this part of the building, until 1926.

In 1929, Cerchez achieved the functional completion of the north-eastern corner of the palace, having created a loggia at the library's level. Above the library, a large storage area was built as an annex to the royal dormitory.

=== The socialist occupation (1947–1948) ===
On 30 December 1947, King Michael I was forced to abdicate by the communists. At that point, the new government had control of the palace which was then uninhabited by the royal family.

On February 13, 1948, the new government held a meeting in which the destiny of the palace would be decided while an inventory of the royal goods was taking place. There were multiple requests for different functions the palace could serve, from the location of the University of Medicine to the headquarters for the National Union of Romanian Students. On May 26 that year, decree number 38 was issued, in which the Presidium of the Great National Assembly of the People's Republic of Romania decided that "all goods and estates that were found from the date of March 6, 1945 in the possession of the former king Mihai and other members of the former royal family shall be passed into the possession of the Romanian state." Finally, on June 18, 1948, the Council of Ministers has decided that the Cotroceni Palace, its "five bodies, 150 rooms, park, the property of the state" would be placed under the administration of the Ministry of Interior. The same decree stipulated that other valuables found within the palace would be redistributed among various ministries, including the Ministry of Agriculture and the Ministry of Health.

After the new administrator of the palace has settled in, around 1,000 objects, including paintings, sculptures, icons, furniture, rugs, draperies, dishes, and other decorative items were missing. They were taken by the Ministry of Art and Information at the proposal of a special commission "to take objects of art from the Cotroceni Palace." The majority of the remaining objects were redistributed to various institutions and organizations, including the press arm of the Ministry of Art and Information, the "Bee" Society (Societatea "Albina"), and the restaurant union "Ambasador".

=== The "Pioneers' Palace" (1949) ===
On April 30, 1949, a school children's program called the "Pioneers" was about to receive its first group ceremony, which would mark a moment in the Cotroceni Palace's history in which it would be re-purposed for the use of these children who were preparing to become "dignified citizens devoted to their homeland and The Romanian Worker's Party." It was around this time when the Cotroceni Palace took on another name – Palatul Pionierilor, known in English as The Pioneers' Palace (also known as young communists).

The retrofit was to take place in four stages, during which the building would allocate rooms for a bigger library and centers or workshops for chess, miniature aircraft, automobiles, radiophony, photography, painting, choreography and dance, history, and ceramics.

In addition to the retrofits, the palace was also to be used as a cinema and auditorium. The Pioneers' Palace, however, was not inaugurated until June 1, 1950 — approximately one year after it was meant to be inaugurated.

=== Modifications by the socialist regime (1949–1976) ===
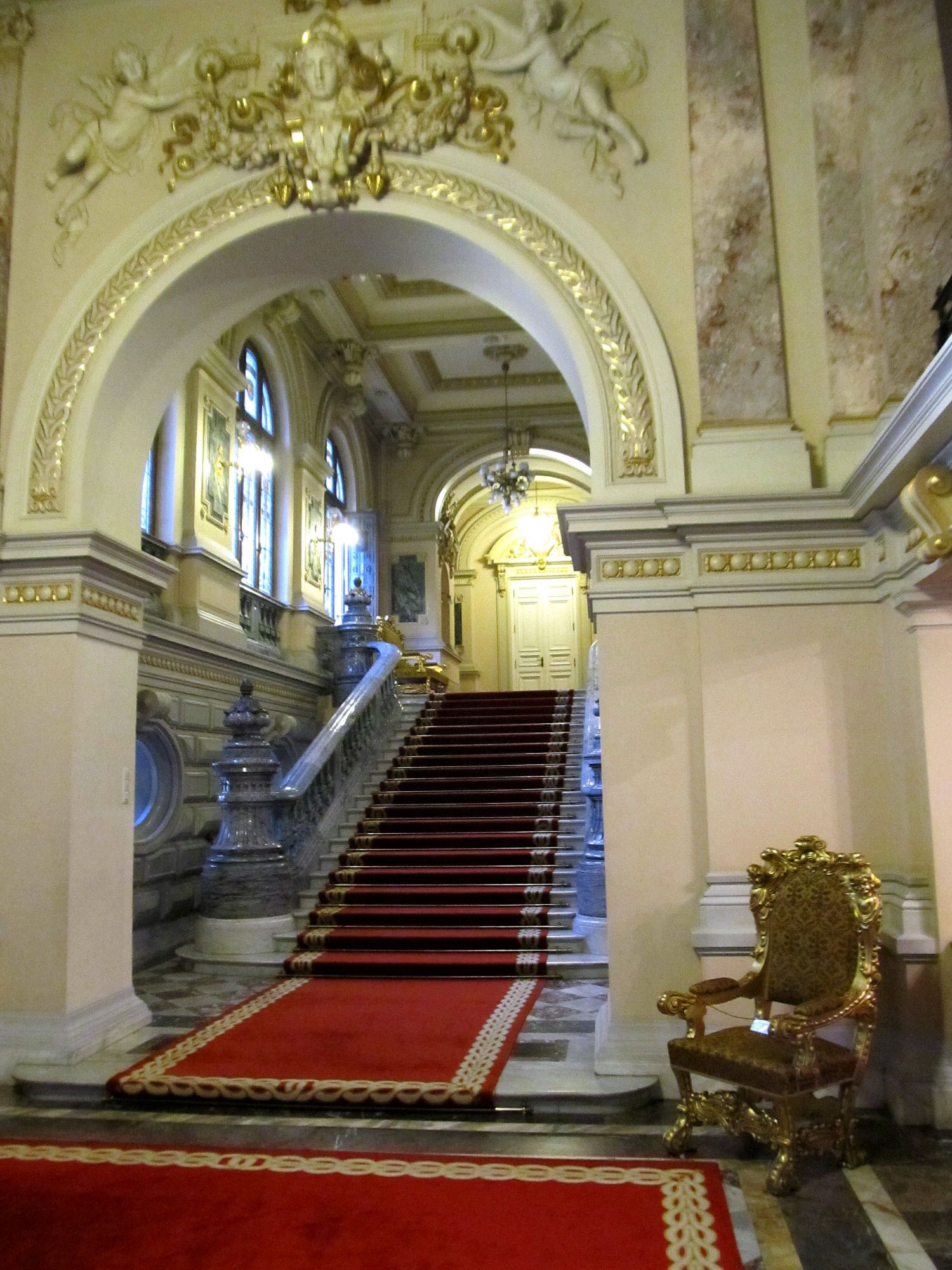
Staircase at the Cotroceni National Museum

After the abdication of King Michael I, the new government made several well-documented changes to the palace:

On the ground floor

- Hanging lamps from the principal entrance were unmounted.
- Plaster ornaments – as well as the anthropomorphic gable over the stairs of honor – were either detached, forced down, or broken.
- Stucco marble pilasters and boards were covered with clay and paint. They were also perforated for the mounting of electrical cords or piping for heat.

On the first floor

- The neo-German-style living room and the Golden Salon were destroyed.
- All of the Ruse stone columns from the White Salon (known also as the Cerchez salon) were painted with dark ash polyvinyl paint.
- All of the space within the new living room (planned by Grigore Cerchez) and kitchen were transformed.

On the second floor

- All of the spaces used by the children of the royal family – as well as the loggia area towards the principal courtyard – were emptied of any finishes.
- The dormitory of Ferdinand I was completely destroyed.
- All of the spaces between the Ferdinand I's dormitory and Maria's painting salon, save for the cherry wood stairs, were dismantled.

On the third floor

- The spaces on this floor have all been modified radically.

In 1976, during the regime of Nicolae Ceaușescu, the Cotroceni Palace once again changed its purpose after its transfer to the State Protocol (Protocolul de Stat). Its new function would be as a residential building – a guest house.

=== 1977 Vrancea earthquake ===
In 1977, a magnitude 7.5 earthquake struck Vrancea County and damaged several buildings in Bucharest. The Cotroceni Palace was among those buildings, and suffered such extensive damage that a project had to be commissioned for restoration and consolidation.

=== Contemporary era ===
The palace hosted the lying in state of former president Ion Iliescu on 6 August 2025.

== National Cotroceni Museum ==
The Cotroceni National Museum is the old Royal Palace, built in 1895. In 1991 the palace became the headquarters of the Romanian Presidency and the old wing of the ensemble was opened to the public as Cotroceni National Museum, envisioned as an insight into past ages.

Many of the palace's function rooms were decorated to the taste of Marie, the English wife of Carol's heir, his nephew Crown Prince Ferdinand. Her extensive art collection is also on display.

=== The Hall of Honour ===
Largely kept intact since the 1890s, the Hall of Honour, built in the French style of Napoleon III, boasts an original Italian marble staircase. The decorations are inspired by the French Opera Garnier.

=== The German Living Room ===
Decorated in the German Neorenaissance style, the German Living room was a place of daily reunion for the royal family. King Carol I was a most enthusiastic advocate of this style and no doubt wished to impose it in the rooms of Cotroceni.

=== The Hunting Room ===
Built in 1926 under the guidance of the Czech architect Karel Liman, the Hunting Room showcases some of King Ferdinand's personal trophies.

=== The Flowers' Room ===
The Flowers' Room was named the Golden Room in the times of Queen Marie. The rich stucco flower decoration was, at the time, gilded.

=== The Library ===
Also known as King Ferdinand's private study room, the library still sports the original elm wood panelling and, even today, houses part of King Ferdinand's collection of books.

=== The Great Hall of Receptions ===
Built by the architect Grigore Cerchez in the Neo-Romanian style, the Great Hall of Receptions today also functions as a place for specific activities hosted by the museum, such as concerts, book launches or art exhibitions.

=== The Royal Dining Room ===
The Royal Dining Room is situated in a wing also designed by Cerchez in the Neo-Romanian style, and features a Neo-Byzantine round table, an original design by Queen Marie.

=== The Apartments ===
The second floor houses the private apartments of the members of the royal family, such as King Ferdinand's apartment, Queen Marie's apartment or the German apartment.

== Collections ==
Comprising approximately 20,000 objects, the collection of the Cotroceni National Museum has been continuously enriched through transfers from other institutions and museums (The National Commission for Administrating State Heritage, The Peles National Museum, the National Arts Museum of Romania) and particularly through acquisitions and generous private donations.

The collection of the National Cotroceni Museum is divided into the following domains: plastic arts (Romanian and international paintings, graphic arts, Romanian and foreign sculpture, religious art), decorative arts (ceramics, glass, metal, textile, furniture), numismatics, medals, history, archaeology.

The plastic arts domain is divided into the following collections: religious arts (wood painted icons), which is representative for the late period of Romanian religious arts (18th- 19th century) and Russian workshops.

The Romanian painting collection gathers paintings by famous Romanian painters of the end of the 19th century up to now. The vast majority of these painters were trained in the renowned Arts school of Bucharest and Iasi while others had the privilege of studying abroad in the famous European schools. After returning, some of them became professors, thus contributing to the improvement of plastic arts and educating a new generation of painters.

Lately, one of the priorities in the heritage acquisitions of Cotroceni National Museum have been the works of artists in the Artistic Youth society, whose activity was prominent at the beginning of the 20th century and encouraged by Queen Mary. Among them: Leon Al. Biju ("Balcic Landscape"), Kimon Loghi ("Balcic coffee shop"), Nicolae Grant ("Landscape").

The graphic arts collection includes numerous drawings, watercolours and engravings from the 19th and 20th century, and Japanese prints. This particular collection was extended through acquisitions and donations of Romanian modern and contemporary graphics.

The decorative art domain is well represented in the permanent exhibitions and includes furniture, ceramics, glass, metal and textiles. The furniture collection is one good reminder of the variety of European styles and evolving techniques. In terms of interior pieces of furniture one can notice wood tables and chairs (Neoromanian style), specific ensembles (Empire, Napoleon the 3rd, Napoleon 3rd, Louis 15th and 16th and oriental furniture).

The ceramics collection include valuable pieces of renowned workshops in Germany, France, Italy, the Netherlands, and Russia. The Sèvres, Meissen, and Kuznetzov porcelain is truly remarkable.

The glass collection includes valuable artistic and historical pieces: the table set of Queen Mary (Neo Byzantine style) and Italian and French workshops.

The textile collection includes carpets of famous workshops of Buchara, Sumak Shirvan.

The collection of the museum also comprises a number of Art Nouveau objects, created by the artistic movement of the 19th and the beginning of the 20th century.

== Visiting hours ==
Visiting hours are Tuesday to Sunday, from 9:30 AM to 5:30 PM. The church can be visited with no prior reservation, from Wednesday to Saturday, 9:30 AM to 5:30 PM and on Sunday, the Liturgy can be attended. Visits are made only within a guided tour. There are two types of tours: the "classic" tour takes 60 minutes and includes the first and second floors, while the "complete" tour, which lasts 100 minutes, also includes the medieval areas of the Palace, the church and the cellars. Museum reservations have to be made 48 hours beforehand.

== Gallery ==
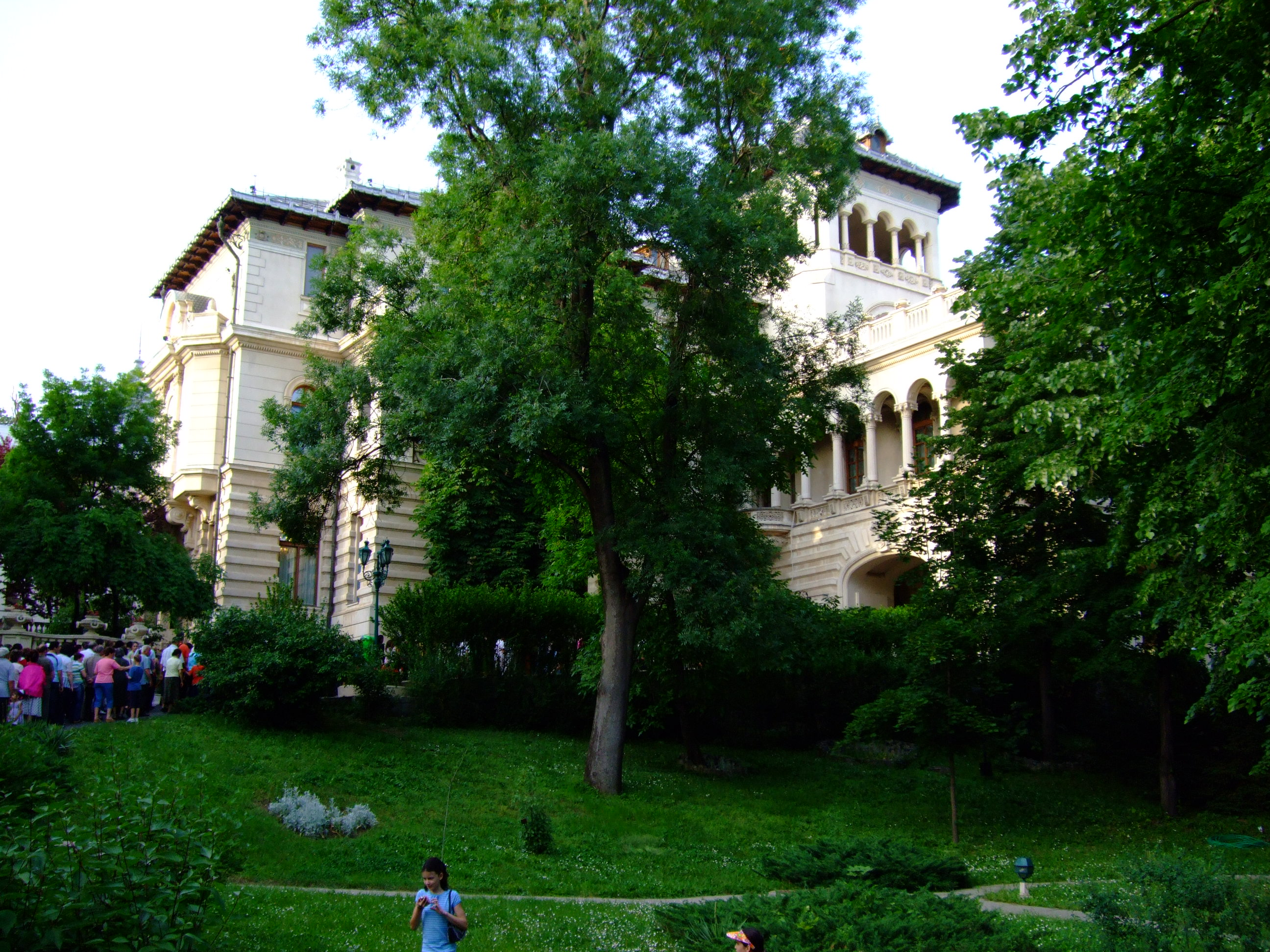

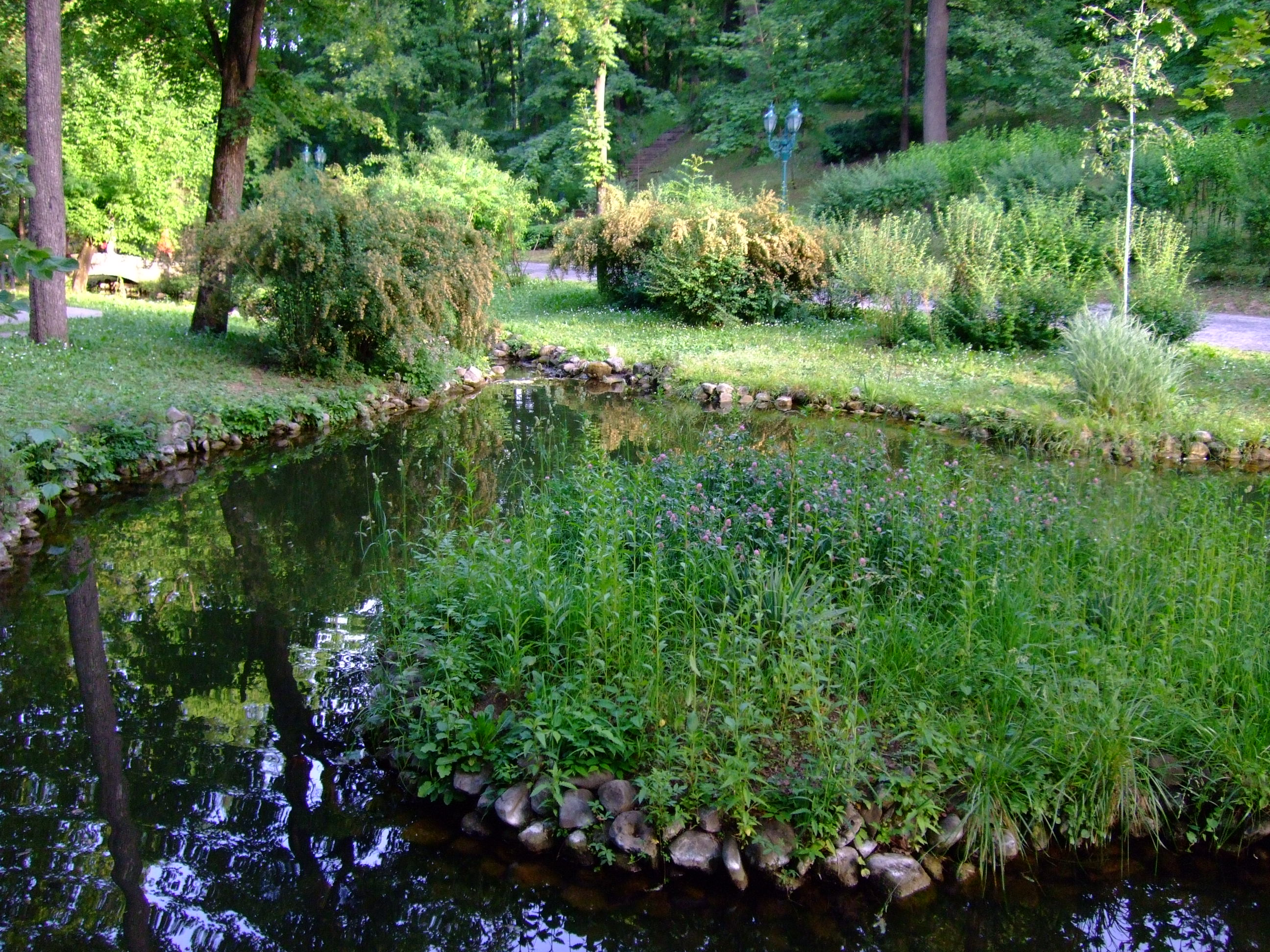
Cotroceni gardens

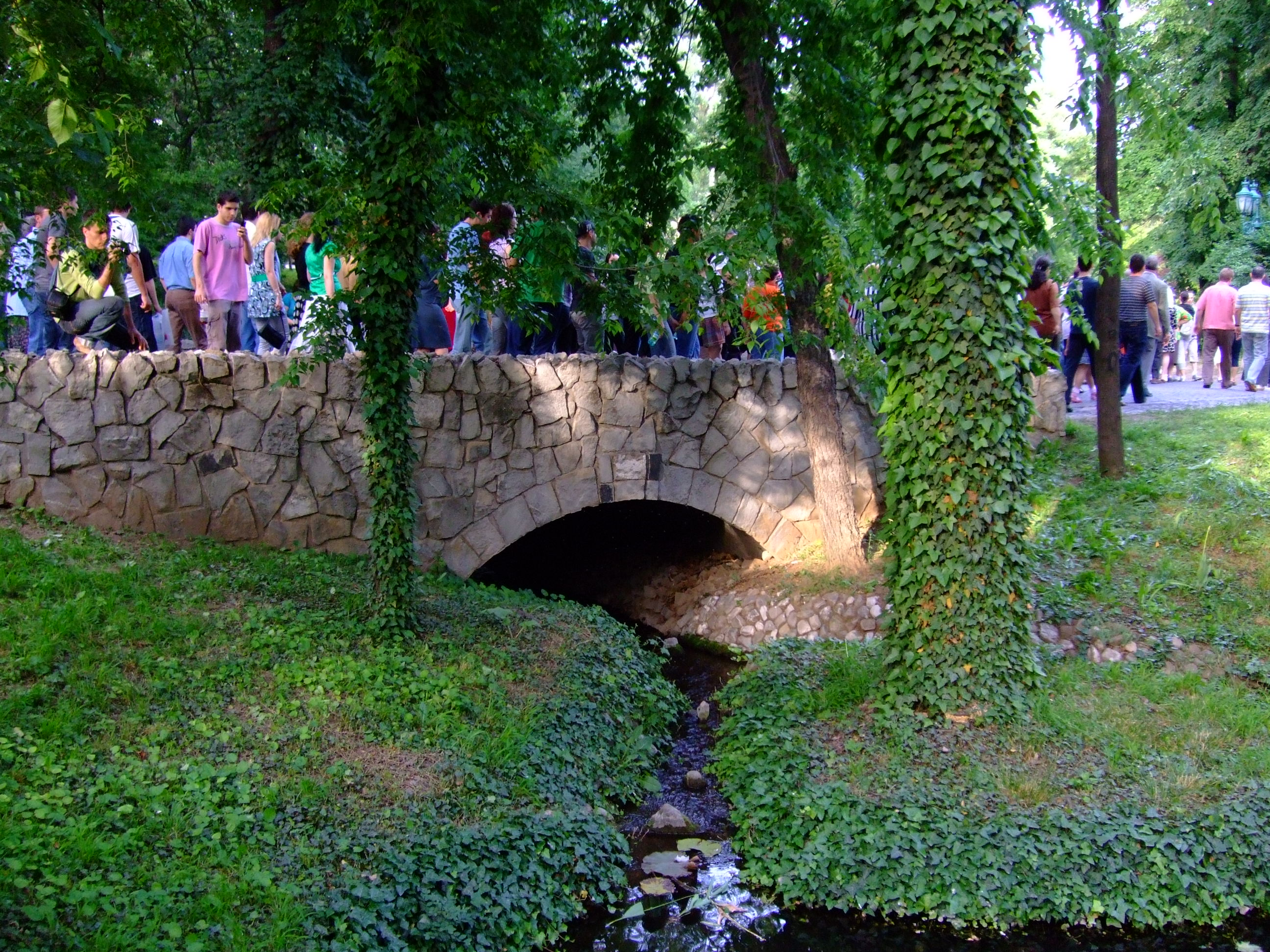

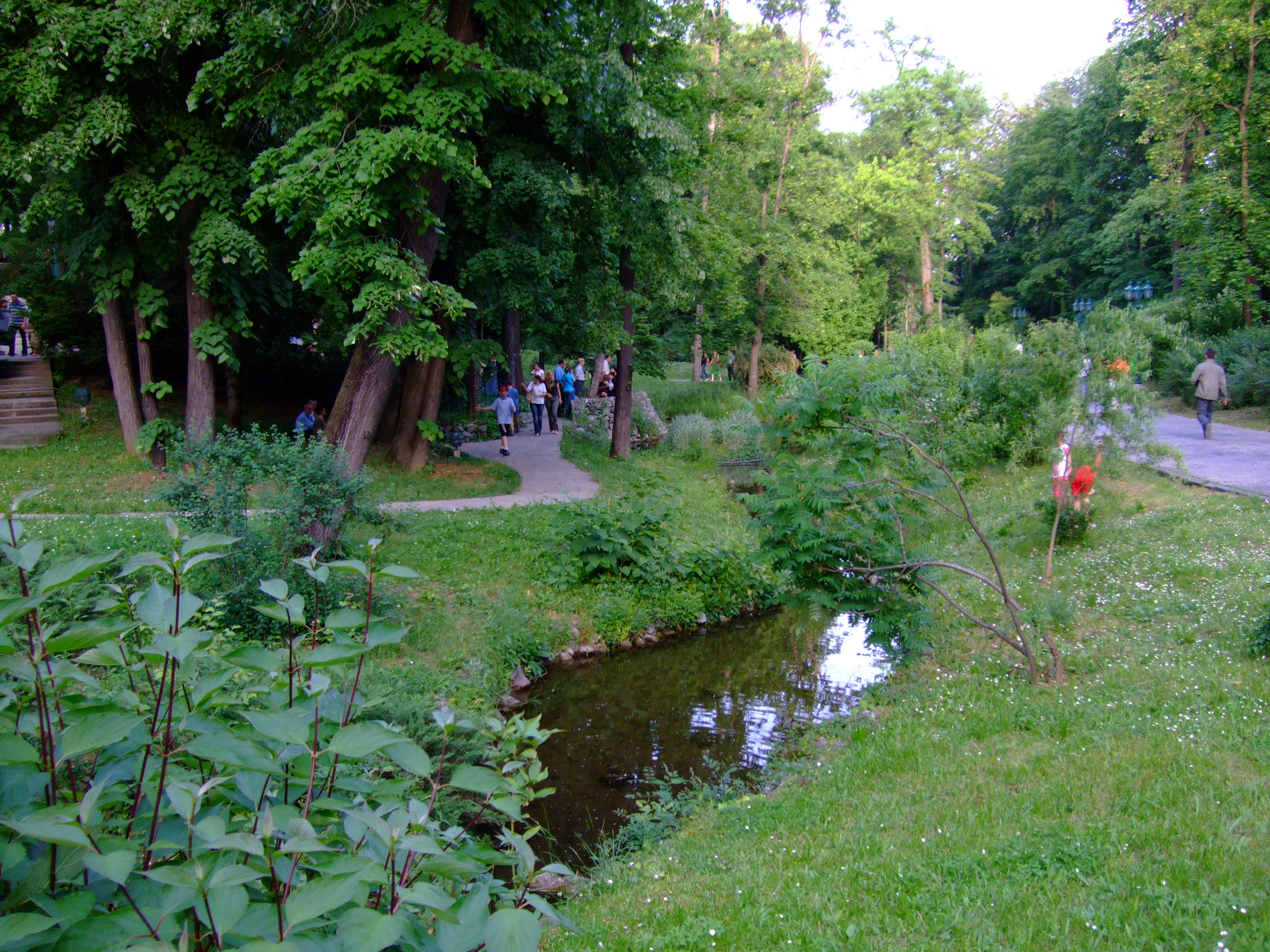

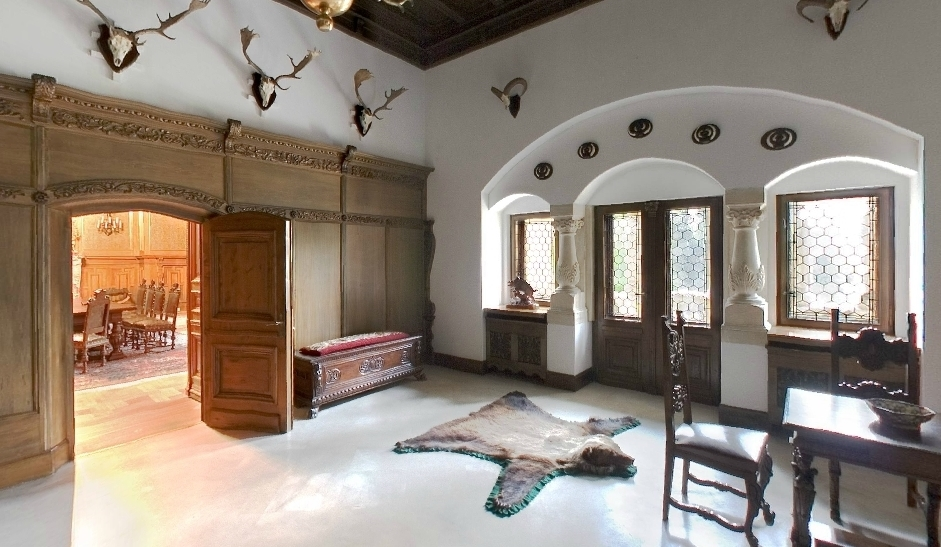

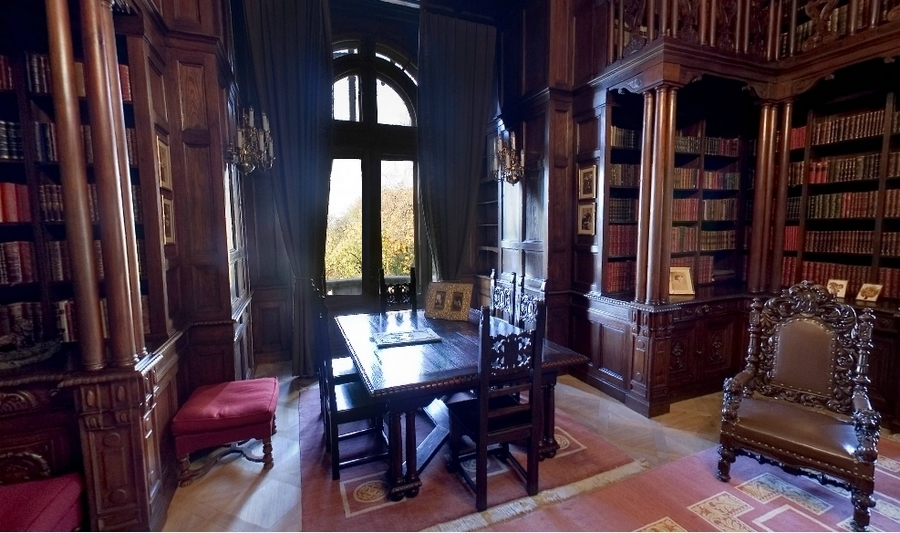

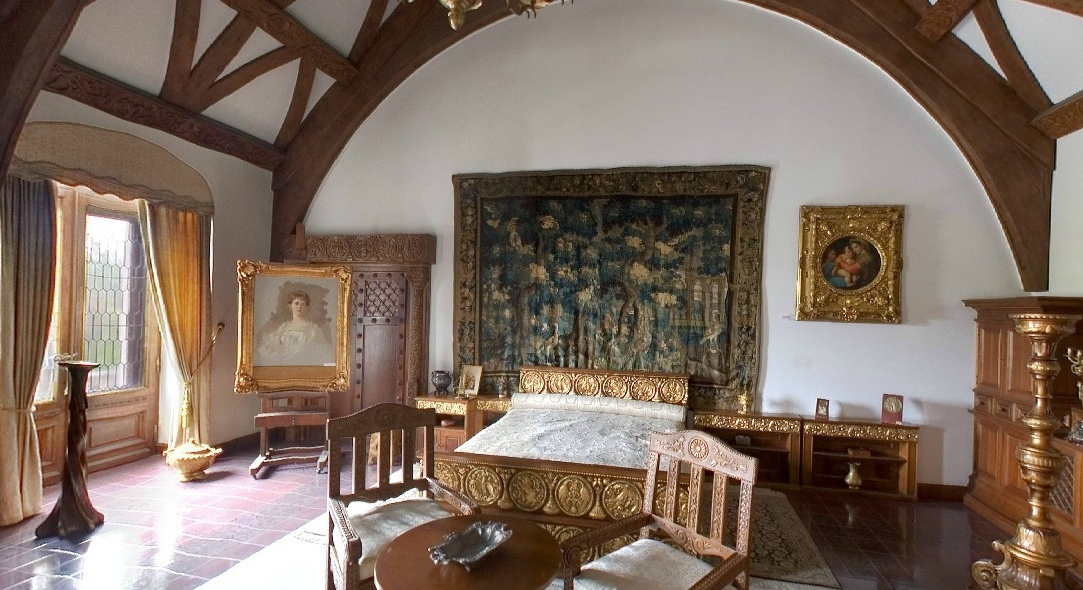

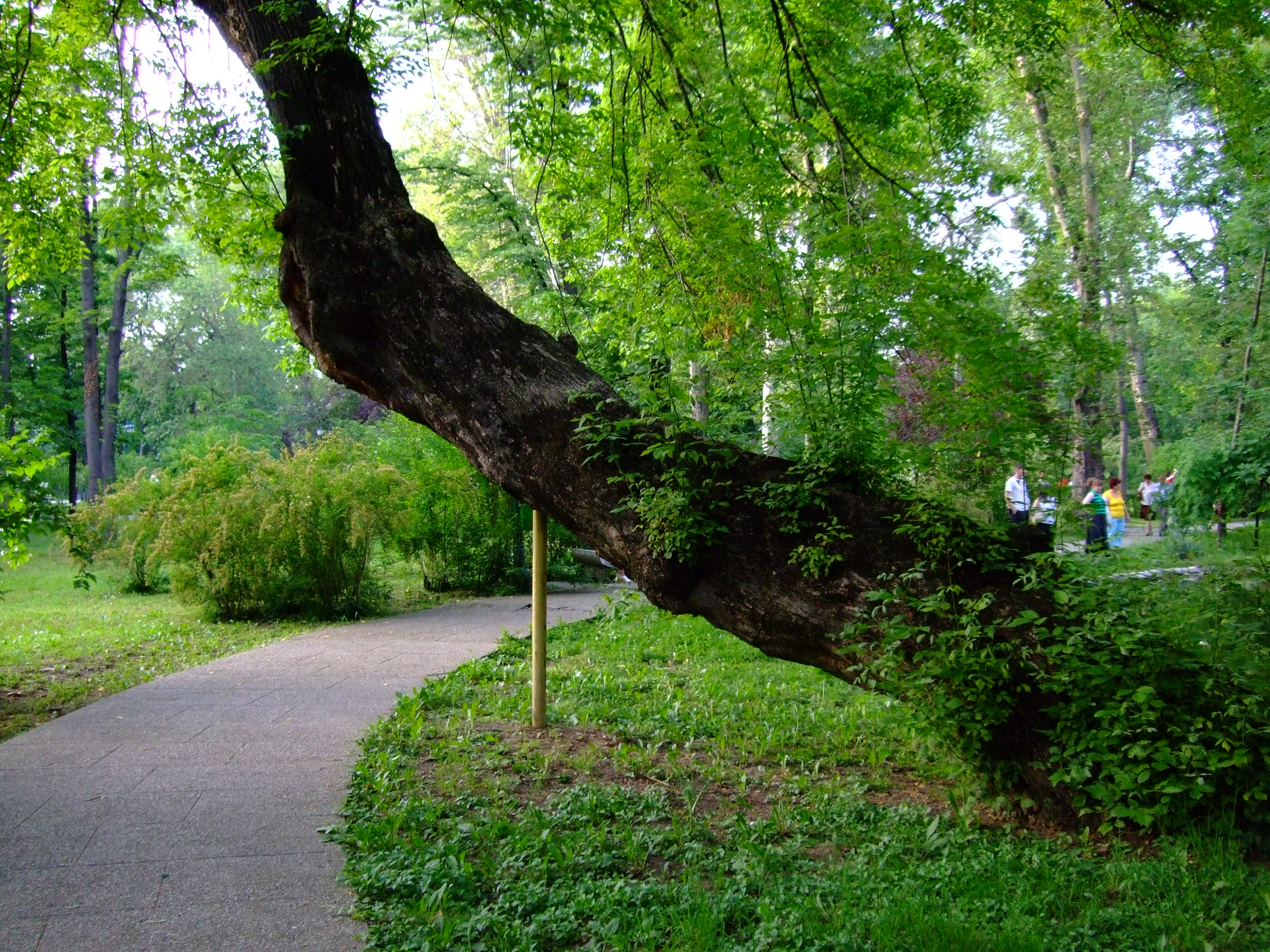

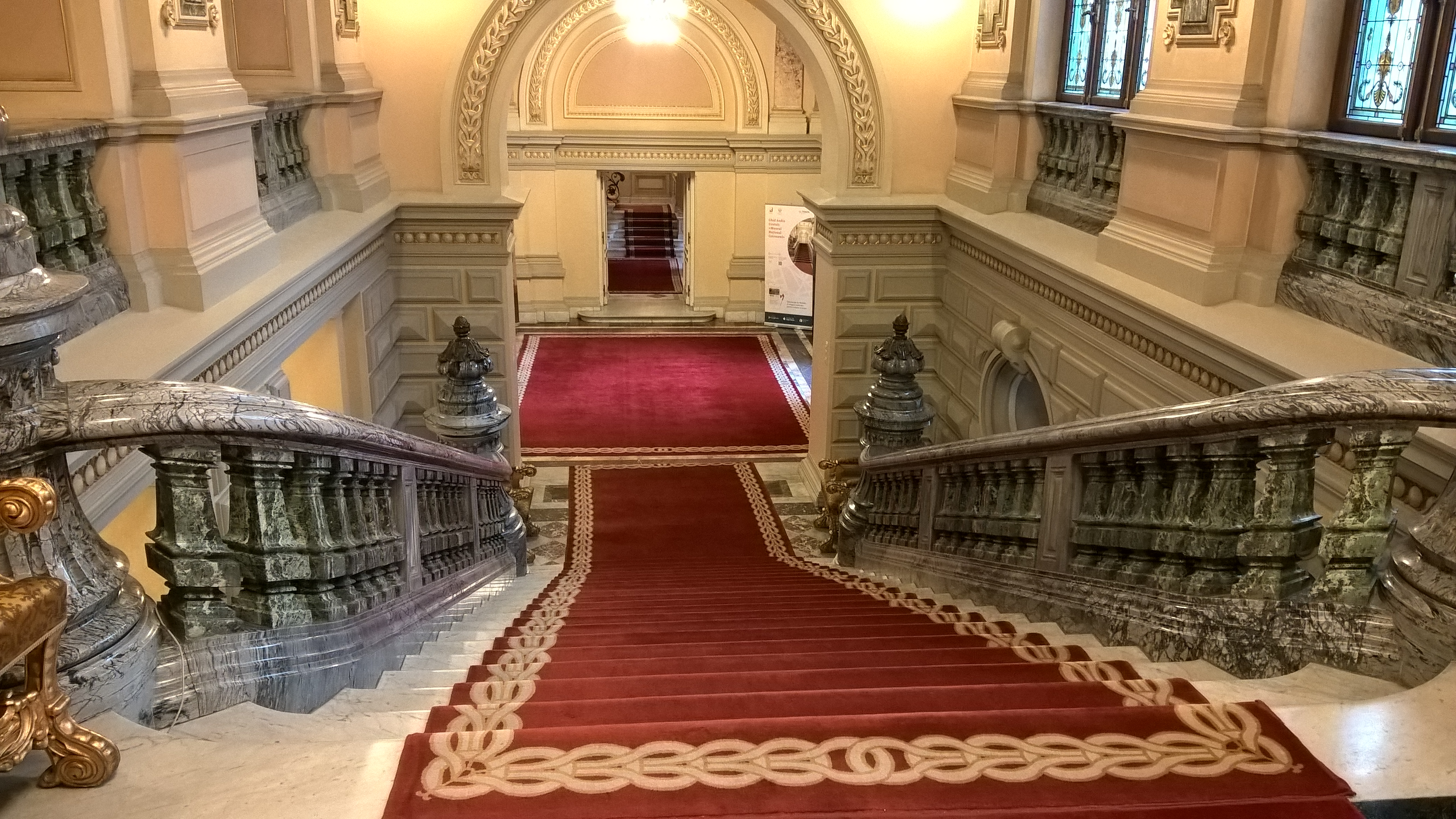

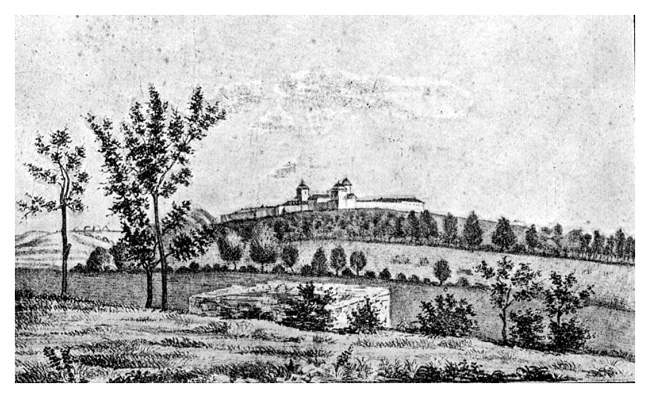
Cotroceni Monastery, 1860

== See also ==
- Brâncovenesc style
- Presidential Palace
