= Oltchim S.A. =

- Company type: Public company
- Traded as: BVB: OLT
- Industry: Chemical products
- Founded: 1966
- Headquarters: Râmnicu Vâlcea, Romania
- Key people: Constantin Roibu, CEO
- Products: Inorganic products, Macromolecular products, Synthesys organic products
- Revenue: € 380 million (2011)
- Number of employees: 3,470 (2011)
- Parent: state owned
- Website: Official website

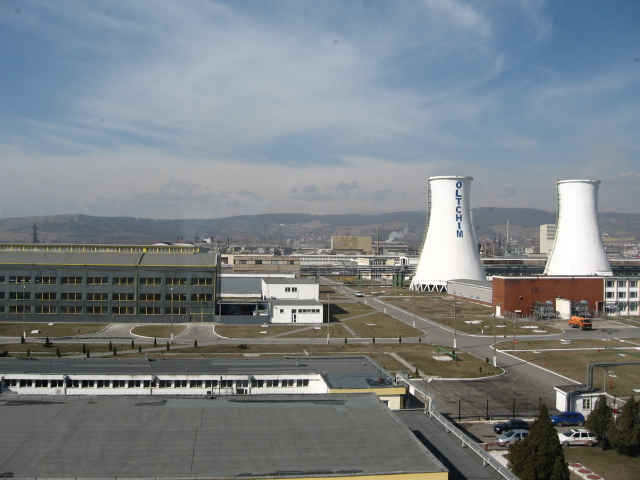
Oltchim

Oltchim S.A., is one of the largest chemical companies in Romania and Southeastern Europe, with a total of 3470 employees in 2011. It was established in 1966 under the name Râmnicu Vâlcea Chemical Works. Constructions of the facilities began in July 1966. The first plant, Mercury Cells Electrolysis, was commissioned on 28 July 1968. In 1990, a government decision, turned the Râmnicu Vâlcea Chemical Works into a joint-stock company, called Oltchim S.A. The current company is exporting in more than 80 countries.

Since 1997, Oltchim is listed on the Bucharest Stock Exchange.

== Products ==
- PVC
- propylene oxide
- propylene glycol and polyether polyols
- caustic soda
- other chlorosodics
- construction materials
