= Radu Cantacuzino =

Romanian prince, general and adventurer

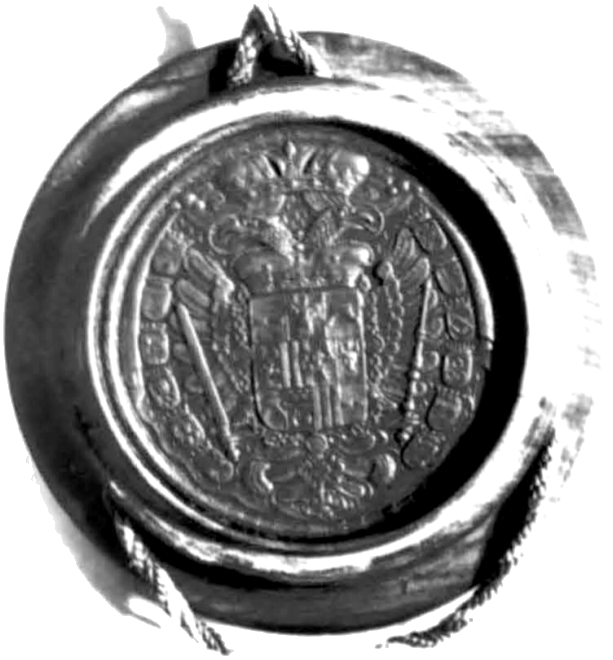
- Wax imprint of Radu Cantacuzino's seal, from a 1744 diploma
- Born: 17 March 1699; Bucharest
- Died: 1761 (aged 61–62); Kamianets-Podilskyi
- Spouse: Elisabeth d'Estival
- Issue: Leopoldina Cantacuzino; Cecilia Cantacuzino; Maria Cantacuzino; Elisabeta Cantacuzino; George Cantacuzino
- Dynasty: Cantacuzino
- Father: Ștefan Cantacuzino
- Mother: Păuna Greceanu-Cantacuzino

Radu Cantacuzino (Note: Some years into his exile in Vienna, Radu began substituting his name for the German Rudolf. As part of his pretensions, Radu also claimed the full name Ioannes Rodolphus Contacuzenus Angelus Flavius Comnenus ("John Rudolf Kantakouzenos Angelos Flavius Komnenos"). In Romanian histories he is sometimes called Răducanu.) (17 March 1699 – 1761) was an 18th-century Romanian prince, general, adventurer and pretender. As the eldest son of Ștefan Cantacuzino, Prince of Wallachia 1714–1716, Radu was a prospective future ruler of Wallachia, but he and his family were forced to flee into exile after Ștefan, a vassal of the Ottoman Empire, was executed after he was found to be conspiring with the Habsburg monarchy against the Ottomans. Seeking to restore his family to power in Wallachia, Radu travelled through Europe and engaged in various schemes to increase his standing, wealth and power. On his travels, he met with some of the most powerful and influential people of his time, such as Peter the Great of Russia and Frederick the Great of Prussia.

From 1717 to 1745, Radu, his mother Păuna and his younger brother Constantin mainly lived in Vienna, the capital of the Habsburg Monarchy. Though they received a pension and housing by the imperial government, the two brothers viewed it as insufficient. Complaints sent to the government only resulted in their pensions being reduced. Hoping to increase his standing and earn more money, Radu began exaggerating and embellishing his family's origin. The Cantacuzino family claimed descent from the Kantakouzenoi, an influential and powerful noble family of the former Byzantine Empire. Proclaiming himself to be a direct descendant of the Byzantine emperor John VI Kantakouzenos (r. 1347–1354), and of Constantine the Great (r. 306–337), Radu began operating as the grand master of his own invented chivalric order, the "Holy Angelic Illustrious Imperial Order of the Great Holy Martyr St. George", and later claimed to represent the legitimate grand master of the Sacred Military Constantinian Order of Saint George, a chivalric order with invented Byzantine connections. Radu also claimed to be the rightful ruler of several territories in the Balkans, far beyond those his family had actually ruled. His position as grand master of the Constantinian Order might have been recognized by Charles VI, Holy Roman Emperor in 1735.

In 1736, Radu upon his own request was entrusted with the command of a "Illyrian regiment" of soldiers, stationed in Habsburg-controlled Serbia. Radu led these troops into battle in Italy during the War of the Polish Succession. After returning to Serbia with these troops, Radu, accompanied by his brother Constantin, engaged in an unsuccessful and suspicious scheme to attempt to secure the Balkans for their family, hoping to place Constantin on the throne of Serbia and Radu on the throne of Wallachia, partly through encouraging local rebellions against the Habsburgs. Radu was removed from command in 1740 after being accused of mismanaging his troops. By 1744, Radu's claims had begun to be doubted by the aristocrats of Vienna and the prince had also managed to fall into large debts. Viewing Radu as politically and morally suspect on account of his debts, his activities in Serbia, and his grants of knighthoods to commoners and merchants in exchange for money, the rulers of the Habsburg Monarchy, Maria Theresa and Francis I, cancelled Radu's rights to the grand mastership and rendered all titles and privileges granted by him invalid. His reputation destroyed and hoping to escape the local debt collectors, Radu fled Vienna early in 1745. His brother Constantin was arrested in the following year and spent almost forty years in prison.

After leaving Vienna, Radu and his wife Elisabeth d'Estival travelled around Europe, with Radu offering his services to various nobles and still claiming the position of grand master. They travelled to Prussia, Erfurt, Paris, Venice, Dresden, Leipzig, Frankfurt, and possibly thereafter to Rome. Finally, they ended up in Kamianets-Podilskyi, Poland (today Ukraine), where Radu died in 1761.

== Ancestry and early life ==
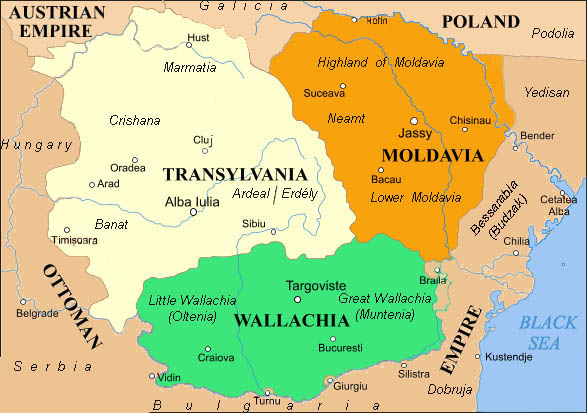
Principality of Transylvania and the Romanian principalities of Wallachia and Moldavia in 1673–1713

Radu Cantacuzino was born in Bucharest on 17 March 1699 as the eldest son of Ștefan Cantacuzino, Prince of Wallachia (r. 1714–1716), and Păuna Greceanu-Cantacuzino. Radu belonged to the Romanian aristocratic Cantacuzino family, which claimed descent from the Kantakouzenos family, an influential noble family in the late Byzantine Empire. First attested in the late 11th century, the Kantakouzenoi were among the richest and most powerful Byzantine families, for a short period they even managed to secure the imperial throne, with John VI Kantakouzenos reigning as Byzantine emperor from 1347 to 1354. After the fall of Constantinople in 1453, certain members of the vast Kantakouzenos family reached the Romanian principalities (Wallachia and Moldavia), where they managed to grow influential and powerful once more. In the 17th century, the family even began reaching rulership positions, with Șerban Cantacuzino (r. 1678–1688), Ștefan's uncle, being the first elected Cantacuzino Prince of Wallachia. Ștefan had risen to power in 1714 through conspiring against his predecessor, Constantin Brâncoveanu (r. 1688–1714).

In 1716, Ștefan, in effect an Ottoman appointee, was arrested and executed by the Ottoman Empire in Constantinople after he allied himself Prince Eugene of Savoy, a prominent general in service of the Habsburg monarchy, engaged in a perpetual war against the Ottomans. Fearing for her own life and the lives of her children, Păuna fled to Italy with Radu and her younger son, Constantin Cantacuzino, accompanied by Anton Maria Del Chiaro, who had served as the secretary of Ștefan's predecessor Constantin Brâncoveanu. The family escaped Wallachia on board an English ship, arriving first in Sicily and then travelling through Naples to Rome. Păuna hoped that Radu could convert to Catholicism, which would increase their chances of receiving Western European aid. However, Radu did not do this. In 1717, Păuna, Radu and Constantin arrived in Vienna, the capital of the Habsburg Monarchy. Staying in the vicinity of the Carinthian Gate, in a heavily populated suburb, Păuna hoped to get recognition and support from the Habsburgs to install Radu as Prince of Wallachia. Around this time, the family also became acquainted with Inocențiu Micu-Klein, a later influential Romanian religious figure. Radu's claim to Wallachia was supported by Pope Clement XI, though Clement noted that Radu and his family had not converted to Catholicism, but attempts at garnering support from the Habsburg government met with failure. A letter from Eugene of Savoy to Charles VI, Holy Roman Emperor, dated to 26 April 1717, concluded that Radu was too young to be supported as a contender for Wallachia, and that a more suitable candidate, if any move were to be made to wrestle control of Wallachia from the Ottomans, could be found in Gheorghe Cantacuzino, son of Șerban Cantacuzino.

== Career ==
=== Early career ===
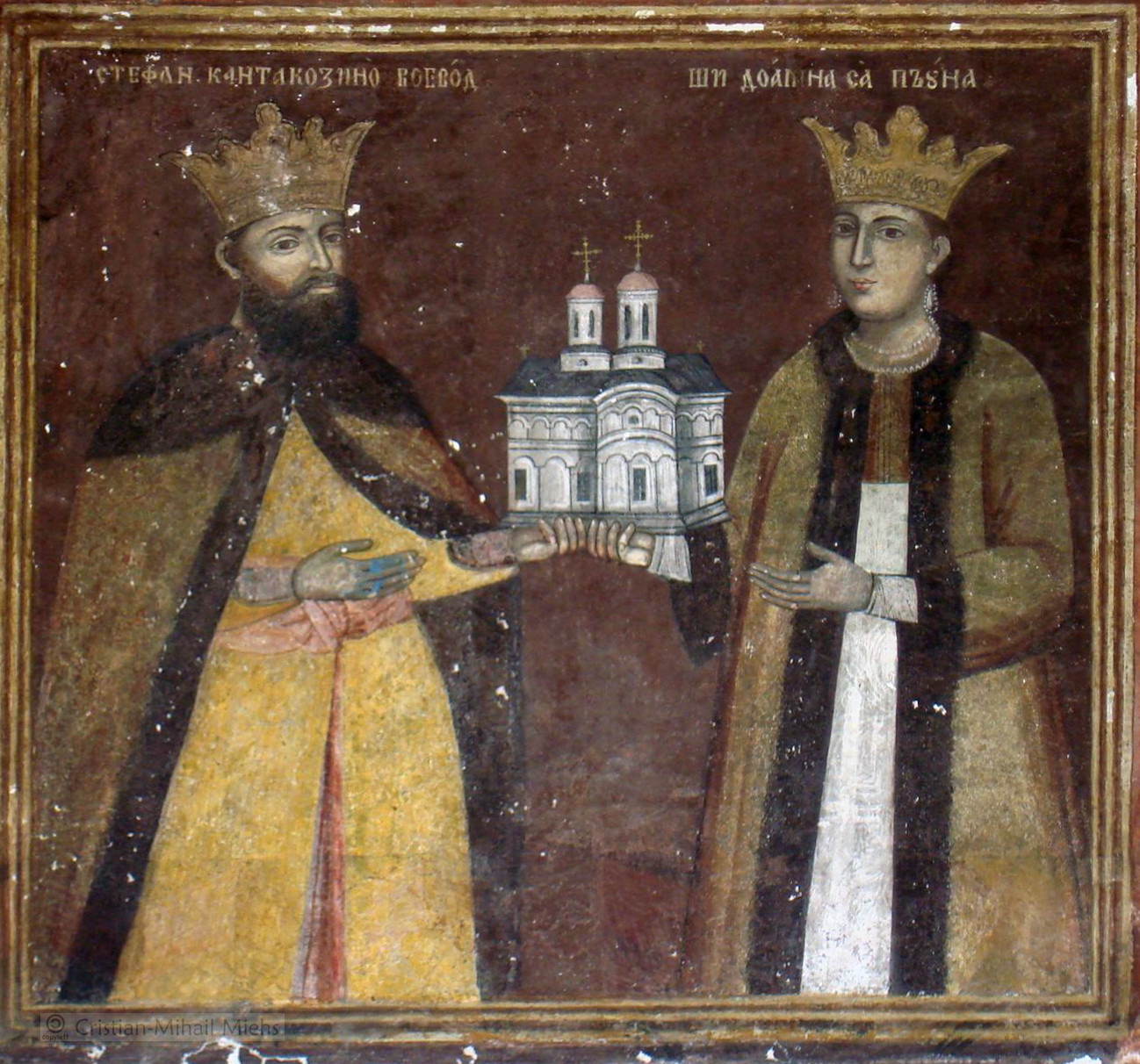
Wall painting depicting Radu's parents, Ștefan (right) and Păuna (left)

Faced with the unlikelihood of her son's accession, Păuna first hoped to send Radu to live out his life in exile the Netherlands, but was unable to do so. After negotiating with Eugene of Savoy, Păuna instead managed to secure Radu's entry into the imperial army in the spring of 1718, as well as a pension of 2,000 florins. By this point, Radu had adjusted his first name to the German Rudolf. At an unspecified date, Păuna, Radu and Constantin travelled to Russia, where Emperor Peter the Great placed them under the protection of Dimitrie Cantemir. The stay in Russia did not last for long, as Cantemir died in 1723 and Peter in 1725. Radu travelled back to Vienna in 1724, passing through Poland, where his presence is recorded in September 1724. Păuna and Constantin left Russia in May 1725, when Peter's successor, Catherine I, allowed her to "return to her homeland, of her own free will".

The pension paid to Radu and Constantin was not enough to support their retinue and their aristocratic way of life. In 1725, Radu petitioned Pope Benedict XIII for help, but papal response was nothing more than words of encouragement. Radu also travelled to Warsaw, meeting with the Polish king Augustus the Strong, and to Venice, seeking to offer his services in exchange for funds. Radu returned to Vienna, where he grew increasingly dissatisfied with the family's poor residence and their scant imperial support, which clashed with his and Constantin's self-image. In July 1726, Radu and Constantin wrote a letter of complaint to Eugene of Savoy. In the letter, the two brothers complained that they were unable to maintain the dignity of their rank due to their lack of funds, and that they did not even have a single carriage, even though they were "not accustomed to walking". The letter had the opposite effect of what the brothers hoped. Radu and Constantin had sought to extend their pension to 5,000 florins, but Emperor Charles VI instead retracted the individual bonuses that had previously been granted to the brothers.

=== Claims and pretensions ===
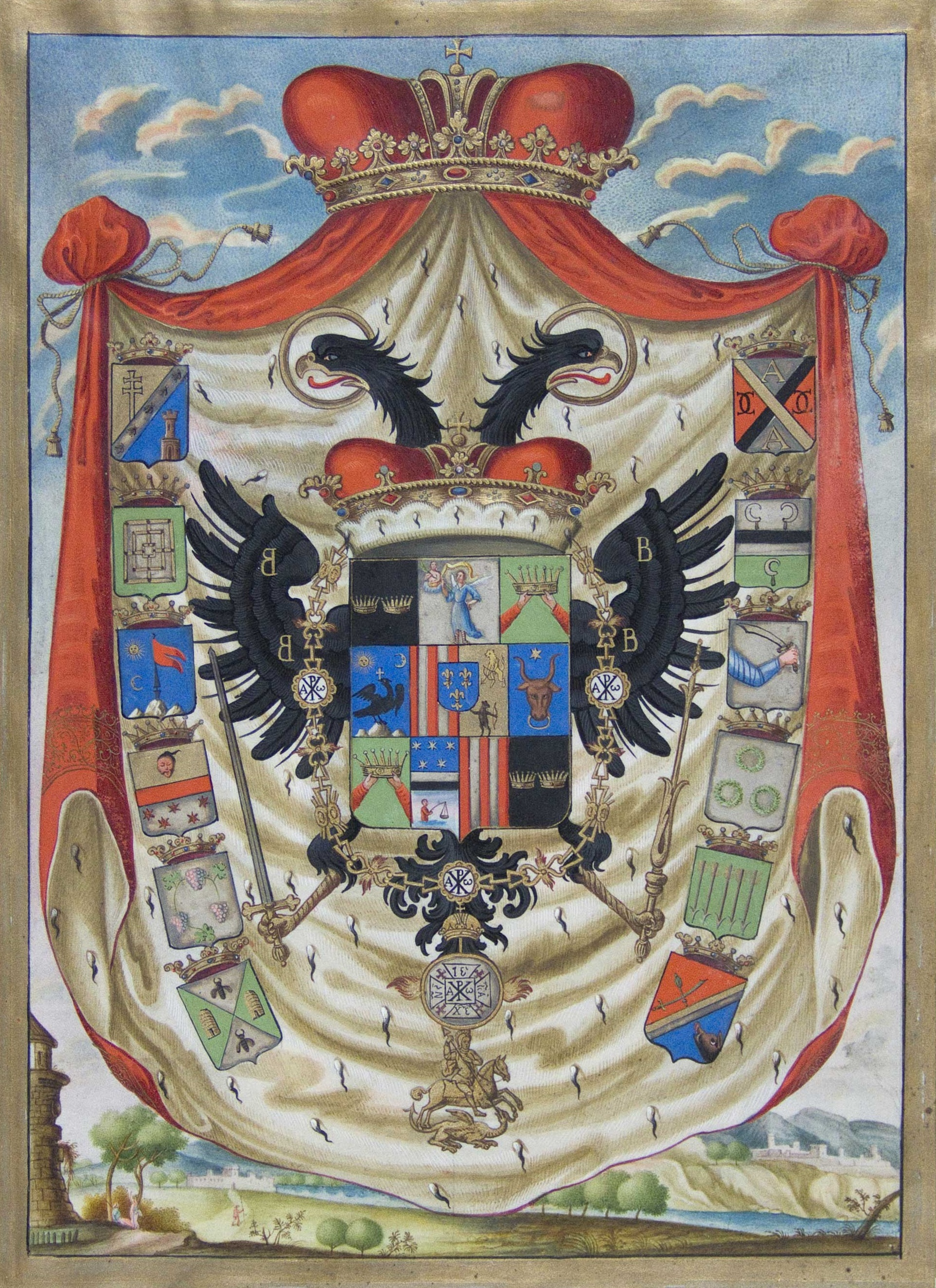
Radu Cantacuzino's coat of arms, as illustrated in 1744

Faced with economical problems and a perceived loss of dignity, Radu turned to an unorthodox method of raising his income: exploiting and exaggerating the illustrious origins of his family. Publishing a great genealogy in 1730, Radu claimed that he was not only a Wallachian prince, but also one of the last legitimate descendants of the Byzantine emperor John VI Kantakouzenos, (Note: Radu was not deeply knowledgeable on Byzantine history. He assigned various different numbers to John VI Kantakouzenos, depending on the document. In some documents, the emperor is numbered as low as John V, in others he is numbered as highly as John IX.) and through him a descendant of other Byzantine imperial dynasties, such as the Angeloi, Komnenoi, and even the ancient Constantinian dynasty. In his own words, he was a "legitimate descendant of the great Constantine, and other emperors". Radu also proclaimed himself as the head of a non-existent chivalric order, the "Holy Angelic Illustrious Imperial Order of the Great Holy Martyr St. George". In order to emphasize his supposed imperial origins, he assumed several former imperial names, styling himself as Ioannes Rodulphus, princeps Contacuzenus Angelus Flavius Comnenus. Radu gathered a group of supporters, which included other Romanian exiles, such as his advisor Radu Golescu, as well as adventurers, such as the Italian Giambattista Tedeschi. Unlike many previous and later "Byzantine pretenders", Radu's aristocratic and noble status was not imaginary, only exaggerated and embellished.

In 1735, Radu's status and dignity experienced a massive increase. An imperial decree issued on 1 February 1735 recognized Radu as the grand master of the Sacred Military Constantinian Order of Saint George, a chivalric order with invented Byzantine connections, in favour of the up until then imperially recognized claimant to that position, Gian Antonio Lazier, whom Radu had clearly been inspired by. Lazier was unconcerned with Radu's attempt at usurpation and continued to claim the position until his death in 1738. The actual incumbent legitimate grand master of the order, Francesco Farnese, did not give up his claim or recognize either Lazier or Cantacuzino.

In addition to bestowing the grand mastership upon him, the 1735 document also formally recognized Radu as a prince, and as a "descendant of the Roman emperors of the East and West". In addition to claiming imperial dignity, the Wallachian princely position and various titles in Romania, Radu also claimed the titles Despot of the Peloponnese and Prince of Thessaly and Macedonia, otherwise used by Lazier. (Note: Radu's full claimed titles were "Duke of Wallachia, Moldavia and Bessarabia, despot of the Peloponnese, prince of Thessaly, Macedonia and the Holy Roman Empire, of both empires, Count of Epidaurus, Corinth and apostolic count of the Kingdom of Hungary, marquis of Ilfov, Romanați, Teleorman, Suceava, dynast in Galați, Ialomița, Prahova and Dâmbovița, and lord of Oltenia and the Mehedinți Mountains, hospodar of Hotin and Giurgiu, as well as the mines of Telegei, on either side of the Danube, baron of Moghilău, Zănoaga, Afumați, of the two Filipești and of the other territories, fiefs, places and dominions of the serene House of the Cantacuzins in Ukraine and Transylvania".) It is not entirely clear whether the imperial decree was an authentic document issued by Emperor Charles VI, or if it was a fake. As supposed grand master, Radu had the power to grant titles and privileges. His earliest known "beneficiary" was his long-time acquaintance Inocențiu Micu-Klein, who was granted a diploma on 26 October 1735. The imperial pretensions of Radu increased the standing of the Cantacuzino brothers. At some point, Constantin married Ana Șeremeteva, a Russian noblewoman, and Radu himself married Elisabeth d'Estival, a woman of the House of Hesse, though she was of illegitimate birth and poor reputation.

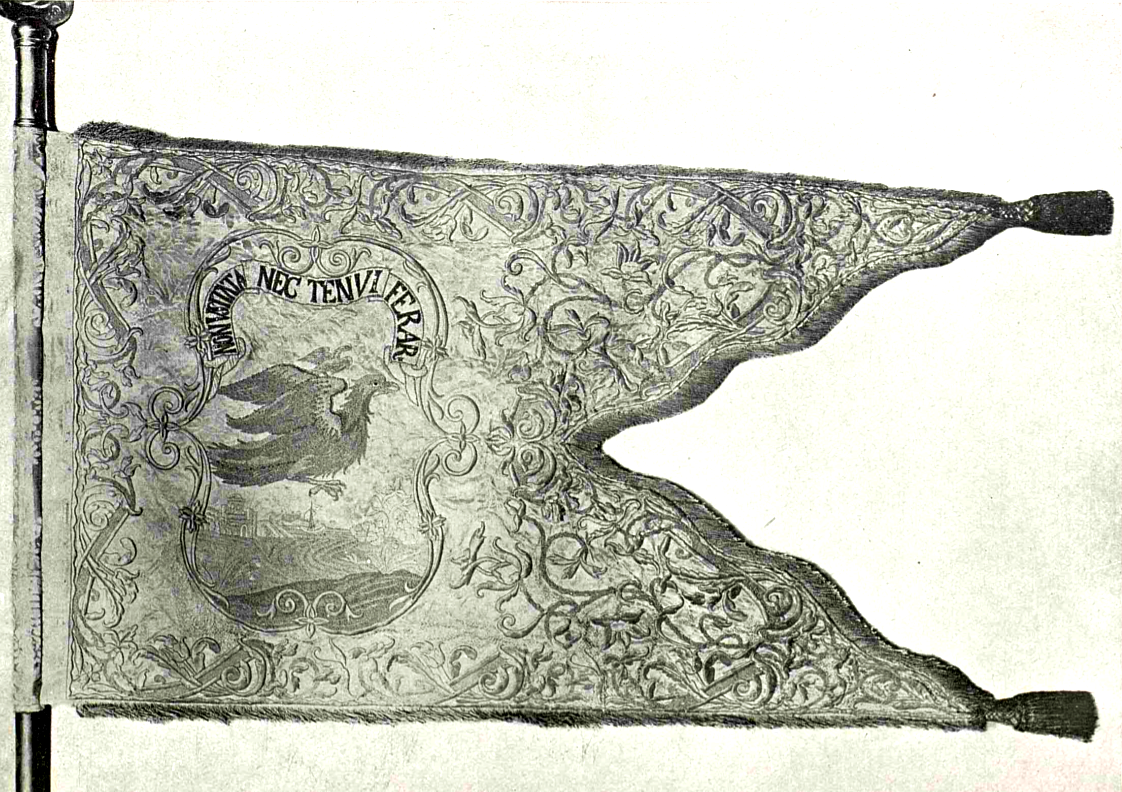
One of the banners used by Cantacuzino's "Illyrian regiment", depicting an eagle

The Habsburg Monarchy expanded into the Balkans through wars with the Ottoman Empire. In 1718, parts of Serbia had come under Habsburg control and in 1736, Radu was entrusted with a "Illyrian regiment" of soldiers there upon his own request. The Habsburg government accepted Radu's request due to fear that he might otherwise offer his services elsewhere, given that the Cantacuzino name was influential in the Balkans and that his departure from the empire could cause "unwanted mischief". Radu led his assigned troops into battle for the Habsburgs in Italy during the War of the Polish Succession, before returning with them to Serbia. The banners of Radu's regiment displayed religious figures, such as John the Baptist and Saint Nicholas, as well as animals, such as lions or eagles. Using his troops, and accompanied by his brother Constantin, Radu attempted to carry out a dubious and suspicious scheme to secure Wallachia for himself, and Serbia for his brother. The brothers may have been involved in an uprising by the local Serbs against the Habsburg government, from which the Cantacuzino hoped to gain. Radu was recalled in 1740 after being accused of mismanaging the large military unit.

=== Fall from grace and later life ===
By 1744, the aristocracy of Vienna had begun to doubt Radu's claims. If Charles VI had recognized Radu, he in any case no longer enjoyed the emperor's protection given that Charles had died in 1740. Through living a "disorderly life", Radu had also incurred large debts. Viewing Radu as morally and politically suspect on account of his activities in Serbia and the complaints levied against him by debt collectors, Charles' successors, Maria Theresa and Francis I, cancelled all rights extended to Radu and forbade him from issuing decrees and diplomas as "grand master". In addition to the other factors, Radu was also viewed as an inappropriate grand master given that he had given out knighthoods not only to nobles, but also to commoners and rich merchants in exchange for money. All titles and privileges granted by Radu were rendered invalid by Maria Theresa and Francis. Radu's requests for his rights and privileges to be restored were rejected. Radu's mother Păuna also died in Vienna in 1744. His reputation destroyed and being faced with considerable debt, Radu fled Vienna early in 1745, narrowly escaping being put on trial for high treason. In 1746, Radu's brother Constantin and his followers, including the nobleman Vlad Boțulescu, were arrested on charges of conspiracy against the state and were sentenced to life in prison. Constantin's arrest probably stemmed from Radu's and Constantin's suspicious earlier activities in Serbia. Constantin spent almost forty years nearly forgotten in prison, only being released in 1781 after many petitions from some of his surviving relatives in Russia. He died in that same year while on his way to Russia.

After leaving Vienna, Radu first travelled to Prussia, offering his services to Frederick the Great, but he was refused on the basis of his past history. Radu even went as far as begging to Frederick's mother, Sophia Dorothea of Hanover, to be allowed to stay, and tried to convince the Prussians to let him serve them on the basis of his ability to gather Romanians and other Balkan exiles under his leadership. Radu and his wife Elisabeth spent the rest of their lives wandering around Europe in poverty, avoiding hostile imperial authorities. After the unsuccessful Prussian venture, they first stayed in Erfurt, where Radu is recorded in 1746, and then travelled to Paris in 1749. Thereafter, they travelled to Venice, Dresden, Leipzig, Frankfurt, and possibly thereafter to Rome. After Frankfurt or Rome, Radu and Elisabeth travelled to Poland. Throughout his time on the run, Radu continued to claim the position of grand master: documents in support of his claim to the Constantinian Order were published in Hamburg as late as 1755. Radu died in Kamianets-Podilskyi, Poland (today Ukraine) in 1761. He was buried at Kamianets-Podilskyi, where his tomb was rediscovered in the early 20th century by the Romanian folklorist and ethnographer Teodor Burada. Radu was survived by five children: the four daughters Leopoldina, Cecilia, Maria and Elisabeta, all married to noblemen, and the son George, born in 1738 and dead in 1771, who served in the Habsburg military.

Assessments of Radu by historians have not been favorable. Nicolae Iorga wrote in 1933 that Radu was a "restless and vicious man, eager for all begging and all betrayals, greedy for honors and especially money, who so cruelly compromised the fame of a family with such brilliant origins and such a purpose". In 2014, Ovidiu Olar wrote that Radu was "constrained by his circumstances, but also constantly sabotaged by [his own] immeasurable pride".
