= Cantacuzino family =

Romanian princely family

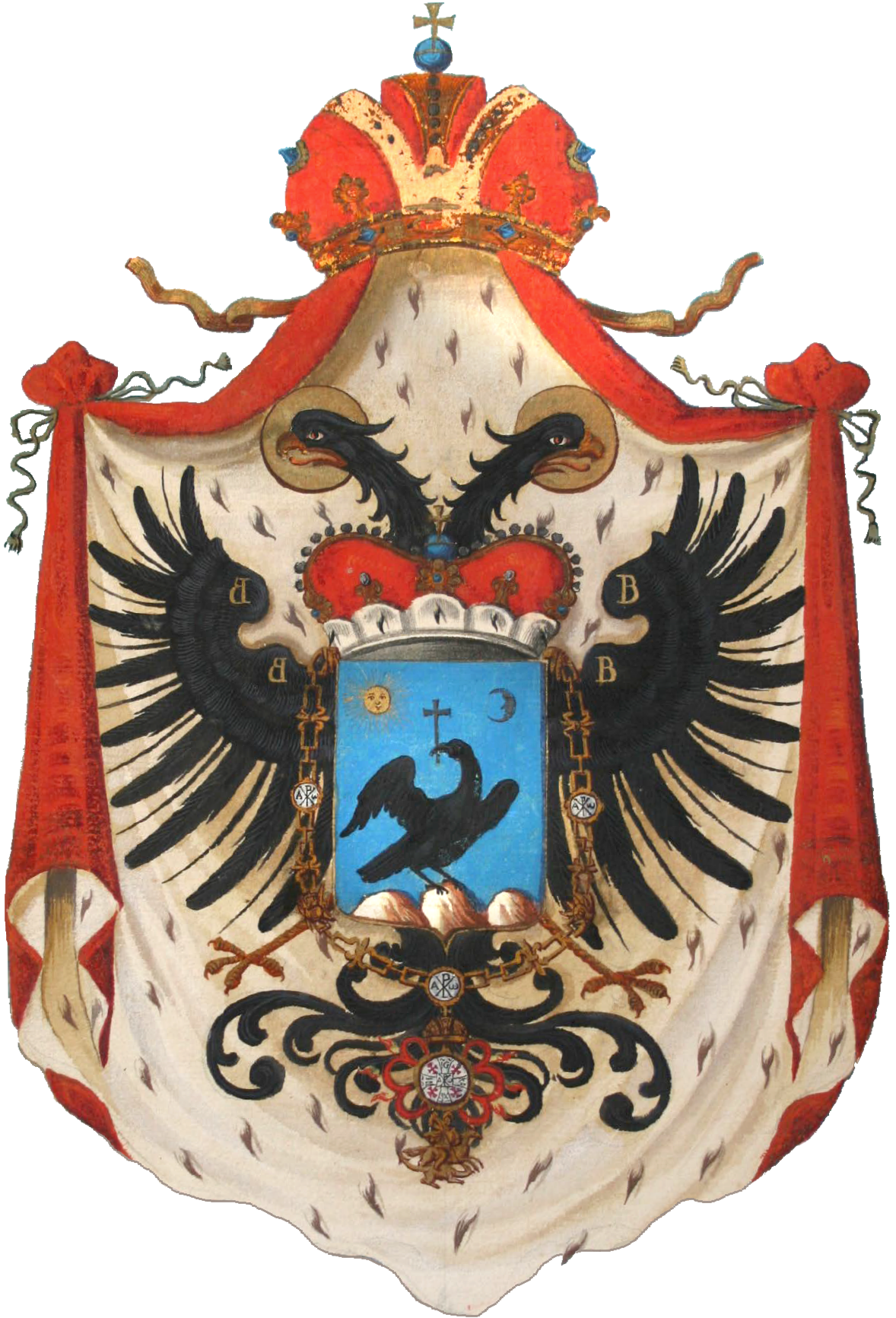
Coat of arms of Gheorghe Cantacuzino, Great Ban of Craiova in 1719–1726

The House of Cantacuzino (French: Cantacuzène; Russian: Кантакузен, romanized: Kantakuzen) is a Romanian aristocratic family of Greek origin. The family gave a number of princes to Wallachia and Moldavia, and it claimed descent from a branch of the Byzantine Kantakouzenos family, specifically from Byzantine Emperor John VI Kantakouzenos (reigned 1347–1354). After the Russo-Ottoman War of 1710–11, a lateral branch of the family settled in Russia, receiving the princely (Knyaz, as opposed to Velikij Knyaz) status. In 1944, Prince Ștefan Cantacuzino settled in Sweden, where his descendants form part of the unintroduced nobility of that country.

== Origin of the family ==
Cantacuzino arms as used in the Kingdom of Romania, c. 1900

Members of the family claim that the genealogical links between the original House of Kantakouzinos and the subsequent House of Cantacuzino have been extensively researched. The family first appears among the Phanariotes in the late 16th century, with Michael "Şeytanoğlu" Kantakouzenos, after a gap of over a century from the Fall of Constantinople. Whether the family is indeed linked to the Byzantine imperial house of Kantakouzenos is disputed, as it was usual among wealthy Greeks of the time to assume Byzantine surnames and claim descent from the famous noble houses of their Byzantine past. The first member of the family to publicly stress his imperial descent on an international level was the adventurer and pretender Radu Cantacuzino (1699–1761), who produced a genealogy linking himself to Emperor John VI Kantakouzenos, though it contained several invented figures. Radu also changed his coat of arms from the earlier arms depicting an eagle holding a cross, to a new rendition with more shields representing various families and regions, a version still in use by the family today.

The eminent Byzantinist Steven Runciman considered the latter-day Kantakouzenoi "perhaps the only family whose claim to be in the direct line from Byzantine Emperors, as authentic", but according to the historian Donald Nicol, "Patriotic Rumanian historians have indeed labored to show that ... of all the Byzantine imperial families that of the Kantakouzenos is the only one which can truthfully be said to have survived to this day; but the line of succession after the middle of the fifteenth century is, to say the least, uncertain."

The origin of the Byzantine family can be traced to Smyrna. The Greek scholar Konstantinos Amantos suggested that "Kantakouzenos" derives from κατὰ-κουζηνᾶν or κατὰ-κουζηνόν, ultimately from the locality of Kouzenas, a name for the southern part of Mount Sipylon near Smyrna. Donald Nicol agrees with this theory, and lists some connections the Kantakouzenoi had with the locale in the 11th and 13th centuries.

== Origin of the Romanian branch ==
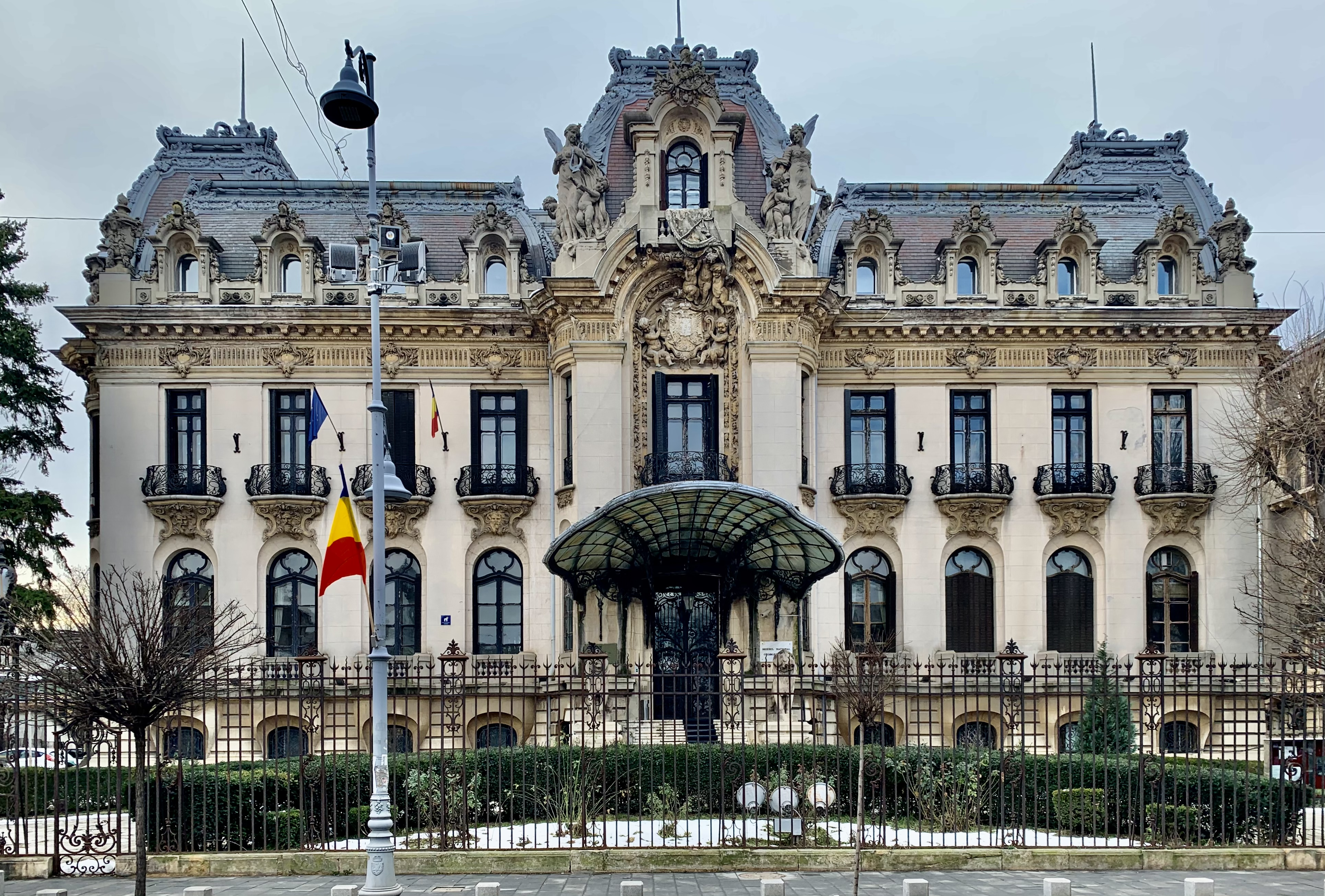
Cantacuzino Palace in Bucharest, Romania

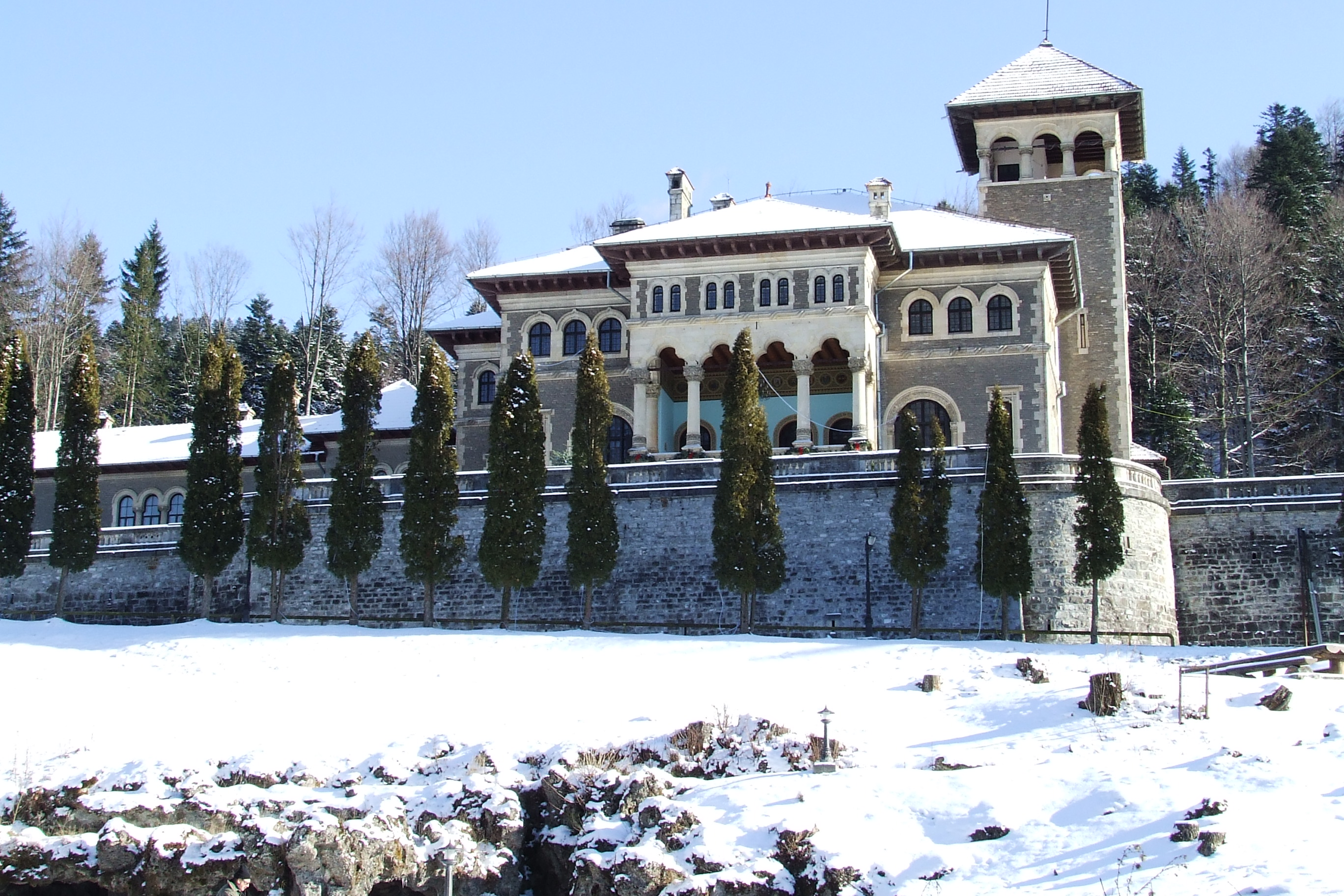
Cantacuzino Castle in Bușteni, Romania

The Greek Kantakouzenos family had been active in Constantinople and Greece during the Greek War of Independence, but several branches of the original Greek family were created via the migrations and establishment of Kantakouzenos family members to different parts of Europe. Two of those new branches were the Romanian (Wallachian and Moldavian) Cantacuzino branch as well as the Russian branch (which is an offshoot of the Wallachian-Moldavian one, among the Russian branch's members Prince Michael who married in 1892 Olga Nikolaievna, daughter of Grand Duke Nicholas Nikolaevich of Russia). As a consequence of the Russian Revolution and the Soviet occupation of Romania after World War II, (between 1944 and 1947) the last two branches now mostly live in Western Europe and North America.

According to Jean-Michel Cantacuzène and Mihail Sturdza, the origin of the Cantacuzino family in Romania is traced to Andronikos Kantakouzenos (1553–1601; also known as Andronik), a Greek financier from Constantinople, son of the "Prince of the Greeks" Michael "Şeytanoğlu" Kantakouzenos. Andronikos had among his several sons two who became "boyars" in what today is Romania and founded the yet-surviving new branches of Cantacuzino:

- "boyar" Georgios 'Iordaki' Kantakouzenos became forefather of the Moldavian branch, which soon branched to Cantacuzino-Deleanu and Cantacuzino-Pasceanu.
- "boyar" Konstantinos 'Kostaki' Kantakouzenos married an heiress (daughter) of the late reigning prince Radu Șerban, onetime ruler of Wallachia, and they founded the Wallachian branches which soon clashed against the Ghica family over power.

== Family tree of notable members ==
- Michael Kantakouzenos Şeytanoğlu (1510–1578)
  - Andronikos Kantakouzenos (1553–1601)
    - Mihai
      - Dumitrașcu Cantacuzino (died 1686), Prince of Moldavia
    - Iordache (died 1663)
      - Toderascu (died 1685)
        - Ionitsa (1664–1692)
          - Iordache (1688–1758)
            - Ionitsa (1721–1789)
              - Matei (1750–1817)
                - Alexandros Kantakouzinos (1787–1841), magnate and politician
                  - Alexandru Cantacuzino (1811–1884), government minister
      - Iordache (died 1700)
        - Iordache (died 1740)
          - Constantin (died 1740)
            - Iordache Cantacuzino (1740–1826)
              - Constantin (1778–1843)
                - Lascar (1805–1885)
                  - Constantin Cantacuzino-Pașcanu (1856–1927), politician
                - Nicolas (1811–1840), married to Lucía Palladi (1821–1860)
                  - Pulcheria (1840–1865), married to Prince Emil zu Sayn-Wittgenstein-Berleburg (1824–1878)
                    - Lucia zu Sayn-Wittgenstein-Beleburg (1859–1903), married Prince Otto Victor von Schönburg-Waldenburg (1856–1888)
                      - Princess Sophie von Schönburg-Waldenburg (1885–1936), married Wilhelm, Prince of Albania
              - Grigore (1779–1809)
                - Elisabeta Știrbey (1805–1874), Princess of Wallachia
              - Alexandru (1786–1832)
                - Ioan Alexandru Cantacuzino (1829–1897)
    - Constantin Cantacuzino (1598–1663); married to Elena Cantacuzino
      - Drăghici Cantacuzino (1630–1667)
        - Parvu (died 1696)
          - Parvu (1689–1751)
            - Ioan (died 1749)
              - Iordache (1747–1803)
                - Constantin Cantacuzino (1793–1877)
                  - Ion C. Cantacuzino (1825–1878), politician
                    - Ioan Cantacuzino (1863–1934), physician and scientist
                  - Adolf (1839–1911)
                    - Scarlat Cantacuzino (1874–1949), poet and diplomat
                - Grigore (1800–1849)
                  - Gheorghe Grigore Cantacuzino (1833–1913), Prime Minister of Romania
                    - Mihail G. Cantacuzino (1867–1928), Mayor of Bucharest and Justice Minister
                      - Constantin Cantacuzino (1905–1958), World War II flying ace
                    - Grigore Gheorghe Cantacuzino (1872–1930), Mayor of Bucharest; married to Alexandrina Cantacuzino (1876–1944), political activist
                      - Alexandru Cantacuzino (1901–1939), politician
            - Matei (died 1742)
              - Pârvu Cantacuzino (died 1769), Ban of Oltenia, the leader of an anti-Ottoman rebellion in 1769
              - Constantin (died 1761)
                - Ioan (1756–1828)
                  - Nicolae (1790–1857)
                    - Vasile (1818–1906)
                      - Matei B. Cantacuzino (1855–1925), Mayor of Iași, Education Minister and Justice Minister
                      - Nicolae (1864–1948)
                        - George Matei Cantacuzino (1899–1960), architect
                          - Serban Cantacuzino (1928–2018), architect
                    - Marie Cantacuzène (1820–1898), painter's model
              - Rodion Cantacuzino (1725–1774)
                - Nikolai Rodionovich Cantacuzène (1761–1841)
                  - Rodion (1812–1880)
                    - Mikhail Rodionovich Cantacuzène-Speransky (1847–1894)
                      - Prince Mikhail Cantacuzène (1875–1955), Russian diplomat; married to Julia Dent Cantacuzène Spiransky-Grant (1876–1975), granddaughter of Ulysses S. Grant and author
                  - Alexander (1813–1857)
                    - Olga Cantacuzène-Altieri (1843–1929), novelist
                  - Ivan (1816–1888)
                    - Pavel (1852–1922)
                      - George (1881–1950)
                        - Pierre (1922–1975)
                          - Ambrose (1947–2009), Bishop of Vevey
      - Șerban Cantacuzino (1634–1688), Voivode of Wallachia 1678–1688
        - Gheorghe Cantacuzino (1673–1739)
          - Toma (1714–1762)
            - Matei (1745–1817)
              - Iordache (1775–1827)
                - Constantin (1811–1876)
                  - Gheorghe Cantacuzino-Râfoveanu (1845–1898), Minister of Finance
                  - Constantin (1847–1920), married to Sabina Brătianu-Cantacuzino (1863–1944), writer
                - Gheorghe (1815–1890)
                  - Ioan (1847–1911)
                    - Gheorghe Cantacuzino-Grănicerul (1869–1937), politician
                    - Ioan Radu (1885–1950), married to Maria Filotti (1883–1956), actress
                      - Ion Filotti Cantacuzino (1908–1975), writer and film producer
                        - Gheorghe I. Cantacuzino (1937–2019), historian
                        - Șerban Cantacuzino (1941–2011), actor
                    - Ioana Cantacuzino (1895–1951)
        - Casandra Cantacuzino (1685–1713), Princess of Moldavia
      - Stanca Brâncoveanu (1637–1699)
      - Constantin Cantacuzino (1639–1716), high official in Wallachia
        - Ștefan Cantacuzino (1675–1716), Voivode of Wallachia 1714–1716; married to Păuna Greceanu-Cantacuzino (died 1740)
          - Radu Cantacuzino (1699–1761)
      - Mihai Cantacuzino (1640–1716)
      - Matei (died 1685)
        - Toma Cantacuzino (died 1721)
  - Ioannis (born 1570)
    - Bella Rosetti (Cantacuzino), wife of Lascaris Rosetti, high chancellor of the Patriarchate of Constantinople and mother of Constantin Rosetti and Prince Antonie Ruset

== See also ==
- Boyars of Moldavia and Wallachia
- Cantacuzino Bible
