= Constantin Cantacuzino (stolnic) =

Romanian nobleman and historian

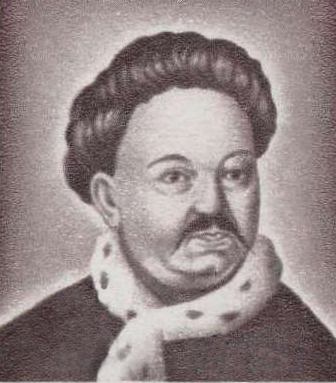
Hurezi fresco of Constantin Cantacuzino on a 2000 Romanian stamp

Constantin Cantacuzino (1639 – Constantinople, 7 June 1716) was a Romanian nobleman and historian who held high offices in the Principality of Wallachia. He was a humanist scholar who drew the first local map of Wallachia in 1700, and started to write a History of Wallachia which remained unfinished. In his History of Wallachia, he "accepted a Daco-Roman mixing" (Lucian Boia) in connection with the origin of the Romanians. A promoter of a prudent anti-Ottoman policy, he was executed together with his son Ștefan.

== Life ==
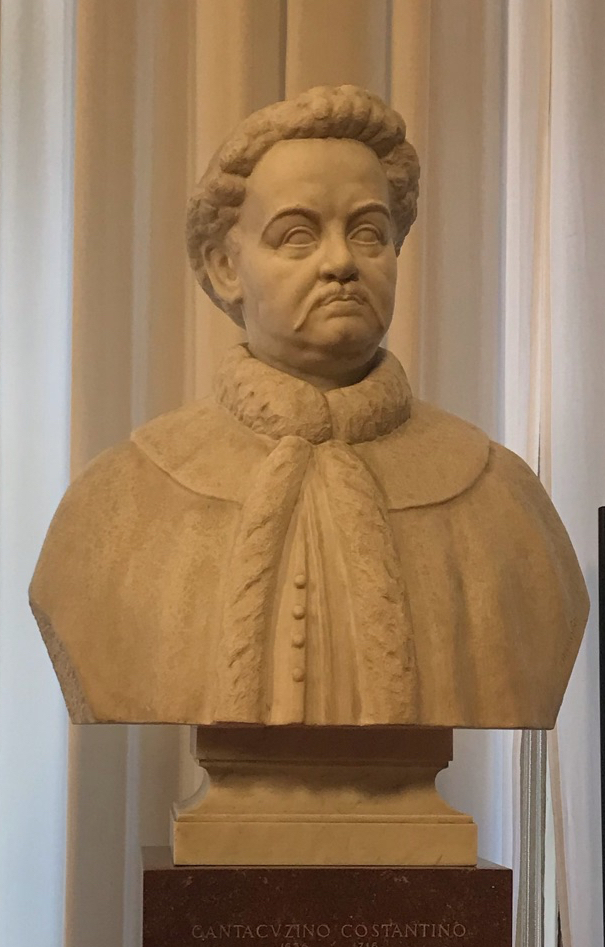
Bust of Cantacuzino at the University of Padua, Palazzo Bo

Constantin Cantacuzino was born in a Wallachian boyar family of Greek origin, which claimed descent from the Byzantine imperial family Kantakouzenos. In the second half of the 17th century, his family led a fierce fight for power with the Băleanu faction, which began with his father's execution in 1663 on the orders of Grigore Ghica. For a short time, he fled to neighboring Moldova.

Constantin Cantacuzino pursued studies in Constantinople 1665-1667 and he also studied at the University of Padua (1667-1668), being well-traveled for his time. He acted as an agent for his family in Constantinople (1672). He was imprisoned by Grigore Ghica and exiled to Crete by the Ottomans (1673), managing to return to Wallachia in 1674.

Appointed vel stolnic ("High Steward") during the pro-Cantacuzene reign of Gheorghe Duca, he was again imprisoned for a short time in 1676. His family's fortunes definitely changed for the better in 1678, when his older brother Șerban became prince of Wallachia. According to Anton Maria Del Chiaro, upon his brother's death (1688), Constantin Cantacuzino was proclaimed prince but refused the throne, instead using his influence to get his nephew Constantin Brâncoveanu elected and confirmed by the Sublime Porte to the position. Subsequently, he became one of the closest advisors of Brâncoveanu, the prince of Wallachia between 1688 and 1714. He promoted a prudent anti-Ottoman policy, being aware of the weak geopolitical position of his country, of the relative weakness of the Russian Empire and of the aggressive religious conversion policy of the Habsburgs.

While Cantacuzino still supported his nephew in 1703 against Alexander Mavrocordatos' intrigue, at a later point their relationship deteriorated. Brâncoveanu didn't completely remove the Cantacuzino family from high offices, but sacked his uncles Constantin and Mihai and promoted instead his cousins Toma (vel spătar) and Ștefan Cantacuzino (vel postelnic). The latter succeeded to the throne of Wallachia upon Brâncoveanu's 1714 deposition and arrest by the Ottomans, again promoting his father to a position of influence. Two years later, Ștefan was deposed himself and executed alongside his father in Constantinople.

Constantin Cantacuzino collected a notable collection of books on various subjects. His views on the origin of the Romanians were widely accepted after Dionisie Fotino published his own History of Old Dacia in 1818 which also refer to the "crosbreeding" of Dacians and Romans.

He was married two times, to Safta Buhuș and Maria (family name unknown). He had another son, Radu (? - d. 1715), and two daughters, Maria (married to Radu Dudescu) and Ilinca. Both sons had issue.

== Sources ==
- Boia, Lucian (2001). History and Myth in Romanian Consciousness (Translated by James Christian Brown). CEU Press. ISBN 963-9116-96-3.
- Georgescu, Vlad (1991). The Romanians: A History. Ohio State University Press. ISBN 0-8142-0511-9.
- Treptow, Kurt W.; Popa, Marcel (1996). Historical Dictionary of Romania. Scarecrow Press, Inc. ISBN 0-8108-3179-1.
- Stoicescu, Nicolae (1971), Dicționar al marilor dregători din Țara Românească și Moldova: sec. XIV-XVII, București: Editura enciclopedică română, pp. 135–136, 138–140
