= Olga Cantacuzène-Altieri =

Russian-Italian aristocrat and novelist

- Princess Cantacuzène-Altieri
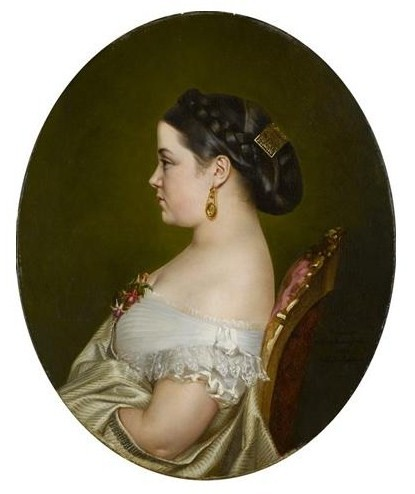
- Portrait by Hermann Winterhalter (1865)
- Born: 25 November 1843; Odessa, Kherson Governorate, Russian Empire
- Died: 25 November 1929 (aged 86); Gattaiola, Province of Lucca, Tuscany, Kingdom of Italy
- Noble family: Cantacuzino family (by birth); Altieri family (by marriage)
- Spouse: Prince Lorenzo Maria Guiseppe Altieri-Oriolo (m. 1876; died 1899)
- Father: Prince Alexander Nikolaevich Cantacuzène
- Mother: Maria Ivanovna, née Baroness Renault

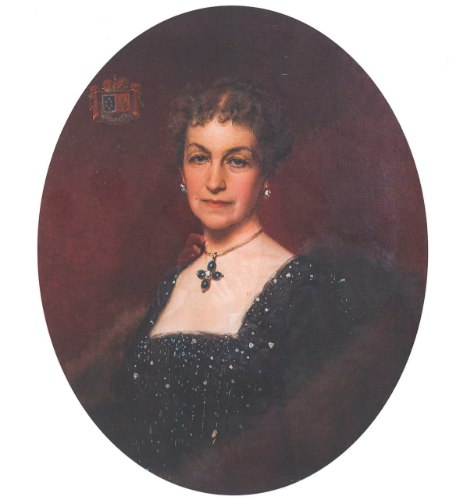
Portrait by Vittorio Matteo Corcos (1904)

Princess Olga Cantacuzène-Altieri (née Princess Cantacuzène; 1843–1929) was a Russian-Italian aristocrat and novelist who wrote in French.

== Life ==
Born into the House of Cantacuzène, Princess Olga Alexandrovna Cantacuzène was the daughter of Prince Alexander Nikolaevich Cantacuzène, a retired captain, was born on 25 November 1843 in Odessa, and his wife, Marie Ivanovna, née Baroness Renault, the daughter of an honorary citizen of Odessa. Olga's paternal grandfather, Major-general Prince Nikolai Rodionovich Cantacuzène, died two years before the birth of his granddaughter. The family lived in Odessa, in the house of the Cantacuzènes.

In 1857, when Olga was fourteen years old, her father died and a year later her mother went to travel around Europe. In Paris, she became close friends with the mistress of the fashion salon, Princess Mathilde Bonaparte, daughter of Napoleon's younger brother, Jérôme. There, in 1862, she met Count Nieuwerkerke, who fell in love with Olga. In 1872, the Count bought a 16th-century villa in Italy, where he settled himself, and invited the entire Cantacuzène family there.

Count Nieuwerkerke found a worthy groom for Olga, and in 1876 she married a representative of an ancient Italian House of Altieri, Prince Lorenzo Maria Guiseppe Altieri-Oriolo (1829–1899). In the late 1870s and early 1880s, Olga and her husband travelled widely in Europe, Asia, Australia, and America. Olga began to record her impressions of what she saw in her diary. It turned out that she had literary abilities. One after another, books began to appear. Many of them have been republished, but nothing has been translated into Russian to this day.

She died in Gattaiola, Italy, on 25 November 1929.

== Works ==
=== In French ===
- Poverina. 2nd ed. Paris: Calmann Lévy, Michel Lévy frères, 1880.
  - "Première partie". Revue des Deux Mondes, 37(2). 15 January 1880.
  - "Deuxième partie". Revue des Deux Mondes, 37(3). 1 February 1880.
  - "Dernière partie". Revue des Deux Mondes, 37(4). 15 February 1880.
- Le Mensonge de Sabine. Paris: C. Lévy, 1881.
  - "Première partie". Revue des Deux Mondes, 40(1). 1 July 1880.
  - "Deuxième partie". Revue des Deux Mondes, 40(2). 15 July 1880.
- Fleur de neige. Paris: Calmann Lévy, Michel Lévy frères, 1885.

=== English translations ===
- In the Spring of my Life. Translated by Euginia Klaus. 1 vol. London: Samuel Tinsley, 1878.
- Carmela: A Novel. Translated by Eugenia Klaus. 3 vol. London: Samuel Tinsley, 1880.
- Poverina: A Story. Translated from the French. New York: D. Appleton & Co., 1881.
- Sabine's Falsehood: A Love Story. Translated by Mary Neal Sherwood. Philadelphia: T. B. Peterson & Brothers, 1881.
- Iréne. Translated by J. E. Simpson. 1 vol. London: Frederick Warne, 1886.
- Radna: or the great conspiracy of 1881. Translated from the French. London: Chatto & Windus, 1887.
- My Indian Summer. Translated by Agnes Euen-Smith. 1 vol. London: A. and C. Black, 1894.
