= Brâncoveni =

- Commune
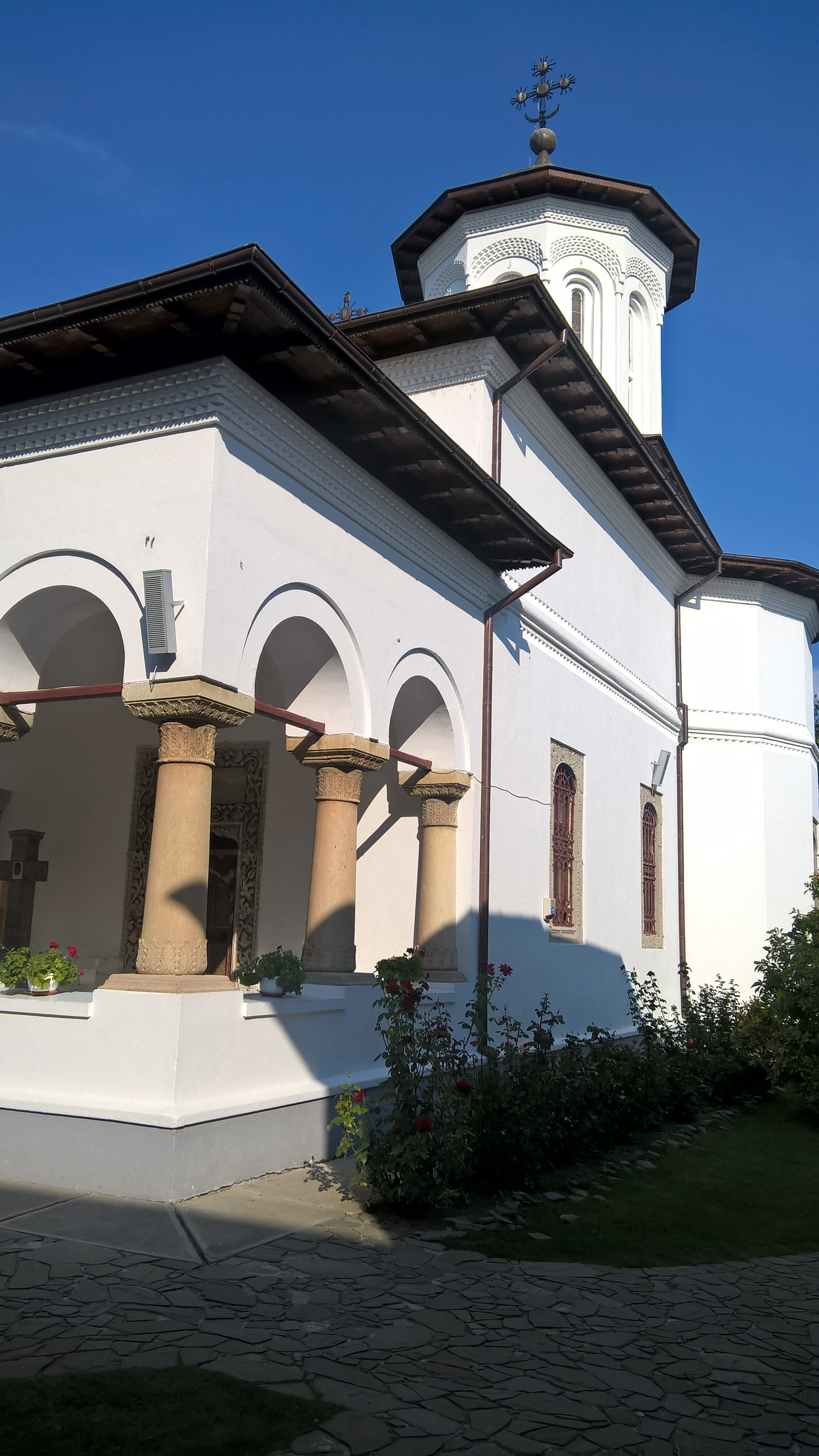
- Brâncoveni Monastery

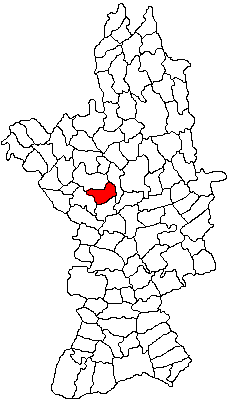
- Location in Olt County

- Location in Romania
- Coordinates: 44°19′N 24°18′E
- Country: Romania
- County: Olt

Government
  - Mayor (2020–2024): Ion Cheroiu (PSD)
- Area: 39.7 km^{2} (15.3 sq mi)
- Elevation: 126 m (413 ft)
- Population (2021-12-01): 2,368
  - Density: 59.6/km^{2} (154/sq mi)
- Time zone: UTC+02:00 (EET)
  - Summer (DST): UTC+03:00 (EEST)
- Postal code: 237050
- Vehicle reg.: OT
- Website: www.primariabrancoveni.ro

Brâncoveni is a commune in Olt County, Oltenia, Romania. It is composed of four villages: Brâncoveni, Mărgheni, Ociogi, and Văleni. It covers an area of 39.7 km^{2} (15.3 sq mi).

== Geography ==
The commune is situated in the Wallachian Plain, at an altitude of 126 m (413 ft). It lies on the right bank of the Olt River; the Oltișor flows through Ociogi village.

Brâncoveni is located in the central part of Olt County, 19 km (12 mi) south of the county seat, Slatina. It is crossed by the national road DN64, which runs from Caracal, 25 km (16 mi) to the south, to Râmnicu Vâlcea, 95 km (59 mi) to the north.

== Natives ==
- Matei Basarab (1588–1654), Prince of Wallachia between 1632 and 1654
- Constantin Brâncoveanu (1654–1714), Prince of Wallachia between 1688 and 1714
