= Constantin Brâncoveanu =

Prince of Wallachia between 1688 and 1714

Prince of Wallachia
- Reign: October 1688 – 15 August 1714
- Predecessor: Șerban Cantacuzino
- Successor: Ștefan Cantacuzino
- Born: 15 August 1654; Brâncoveni, Wallachia
- Died: 15 August 1714 (aged 60); Constantinople, Ottoman Empire
- Spouse: Doamna Marica Brâncoveanu
- Issue: Stanca (1676); Maria (1678); Ilinca (1682); Constantin (1683); Ștefan (1685); Safta (1686); Radu (1690); Ancuța (1691); Bălaşa (1693); Smaranda (1696); Matei (1702)
- Religion: Eastern Orthodox Christian
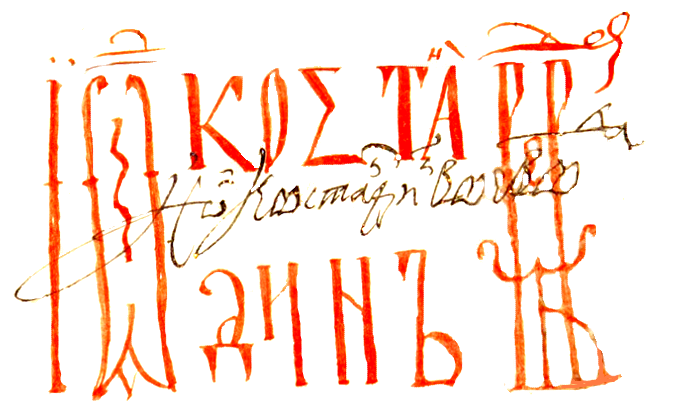
- Signature

Saints Constantin, Constantin, Ștefan, Radu and Matei Brâncoveanu
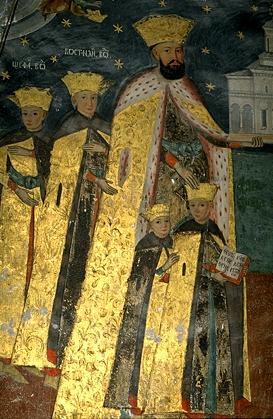

Brancoveanu Martyrs
- Born: 1654 (Constantin); 1683 (Constantin); 1685 (Ștefan); 1690 (Radu); 1702 (Matei); Brâncoveni, Wallachia
- Died: 15 August 1714; Istanbul, Ottoman Empire
- Venerated in: Romanian Orthodox Church and Russian Orthodox Church
- Canonized: 20 June 1992, Bucharest
- Major shrine: Relics at the New St. George Church, Bucharest.
- Feast: 16 August (Eastern Orthodox Church)
- Attributes: They are usually depicted together, wearing golden cloaks.

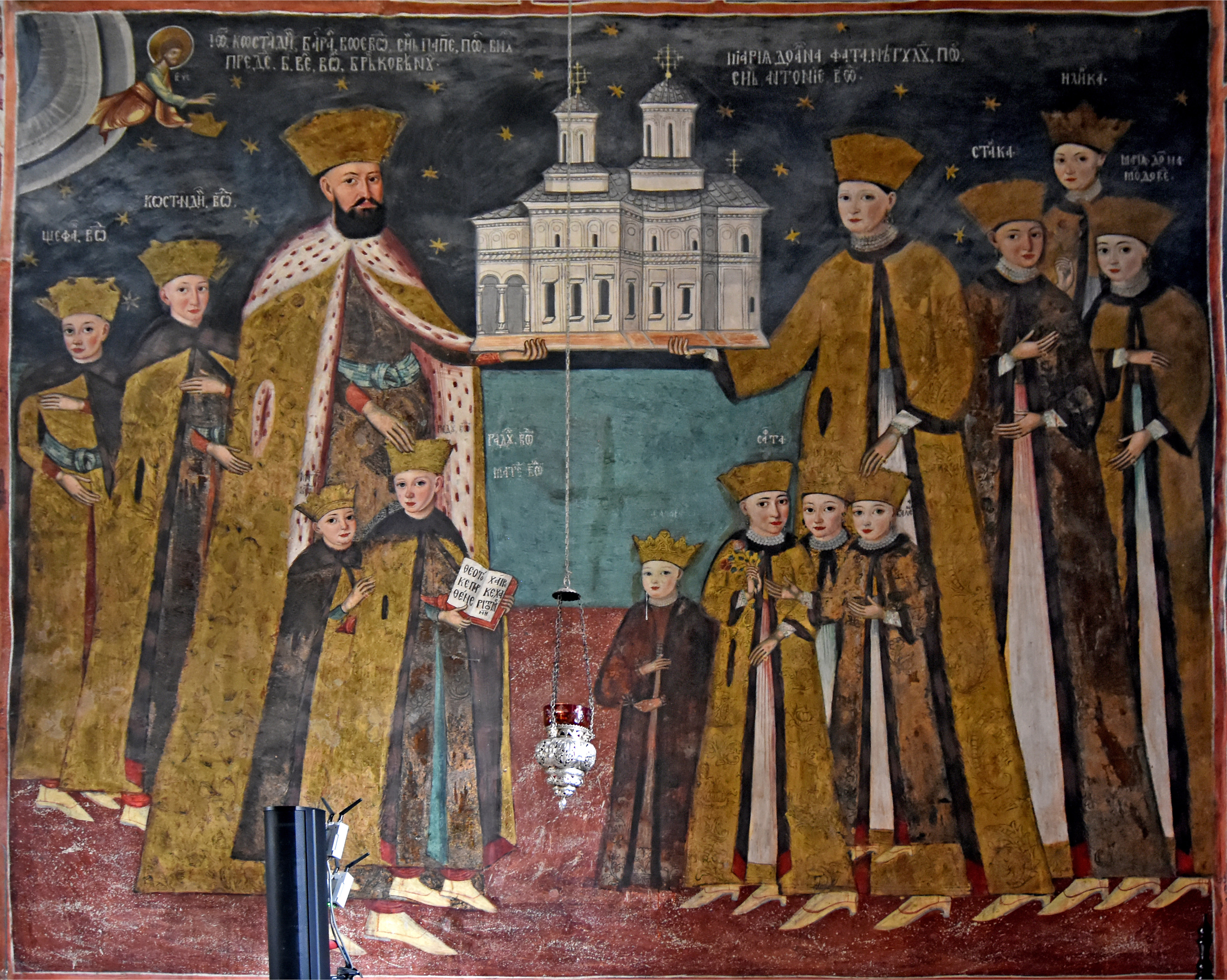
Constantin Brâncoveanu and family, mural from 1709 at Hurezi monastery

Constantin Brâncoveanu (Romanian pronunciation: [konstanˈtin brɨŋkoˈve̯anu]; 1654 – August 15, 1714) was Prince of Wallachia between 1688 and 1714.

== Biography ==
=== Ascension ===
Constantin Brâncoveanu was the son of Pope Brâncoveanu (Matthew) and his wife, Stanca Cantacuzino. Maternally, he was a descendant of the noble Greek family Cantacuzino. Paternally, he was a descendant of the Craiovești boyar family and heir through his grandfather Preda of a considerable part of Matei Basarab′s fortune.

Brâncoveanu was born on the estate of Brâncoveni and raised in the house of his uncle, stolnic Constantin Cantacuzino. He rose to the throne after the death of his uncle, prince Şerban Cantacuzino. He was initially supported by his maternal uncles Constantin and Mihai Cantacuzino, but grew increasingly independent from them in the course of his reign. Constantin Cantacuzino retreated to one of his estates and began advocating his son Ștefan's candidacy to the throne.

=== Policies ===
The prince took steps in negotiating anti-Ottoman alliances first with the Habsburg monarchy, and then with Peter the Great's Russia (see Russo-Turkish War, 1710-1711): upon the 1710 Russian intervention in Moldavia, the prince contacted Tsar Peter and accepted gifts from the latter, while his rivalry with the Moldavian Prince Dimitrie Cantemir (the main regional ally of the Russians) prevented a more decisive political move. Instead, Brâncoveanu gathered Wallachian troops in Urlați, near the Moldavian border, awaiting for Russian troops to storm into his country and offer his services to the tsar, while also readying to join the Ottoman counter-offensive in the event of a change in fortunes. When several of his boyars fled to the Russian camp, the prince saw himself forced to decide in favor of the Ottomans or risk becoming an enemy of his Ottoman suzerain, and swiftly returned the gifts he had received from the Russians.

=== Arrest and execution ===
Such policies were eventually denounced to the Porte. Brâncoveanu was deposed from his throne by Sultan Ahmed III, and brought under arrest to Istanbul, where he was imprisoned in 1714 at the fortress of Yedikule (the Seven Towers). There he was tortured by the Ottomans, who hoped to locate the immense fortune he had supposedly amassed. He and his four sons were beheaded on the same day in August, together with Prince Constantin's faithful friend, grand treasurer Ianache Văcărescu. Most importantly, Constantin and his sons were asked to renounce Christianity and join the Islamic religion, which would pardon them from beheading. They chose to keep their Christian faith.

According to his secretary, Anton Maria Del Chiaro, their heads were then carried on poles through the streets of Istanbul, an episode which caused a great unrest in the city. Fearing a rebellion, including from that of the Muslim population which was outraged by the injustice done to the Prince, his sons and his close friend, he ordered for the bodies to be thrown into the Bosporus. Christian fishermen took the bodies from the water, and buried them at the Halchi Monastery, in the city's vicinity.

=== Death and sanctification in Eastern Orthodoxy ===
The circumstances and facts of Constantin's death are recorded in history, and his sanctification is recognized by all Eastern Orthodox Churches.

On 15 August 1714, the Feast of the Dormition, when Constantin Brâncoveanu was also celebrating his 60th birthday, he and his four sons and boyar Ianache Văcărescu were brought before Sultan Ahmed III of Turkey. Diplomatic representatives of Austria, Russia, France and England were also present. After all of his fortune had been seized, in exchange for the life of his family he was asked to renounce the Orthodox Christian faith. He reportedly said: "Behold, all my fortunes and all I had, I have lost! Let us not lose our souls. Be brave and manly, my beloved! Ignore death. Look at how much Christ, our Savior, has endured for us and with what shameful death he died. Firmly believe in this and do not move, nor leave your faith for this life and this world." After this, his four sons, Constantin, Ștefan, Radu and Matei and advisor Ianache were beheaded in front of their father.

It is also said that the smallest child, Matei (12 years old) was so frightened after seeing the bloodbath and the heads of his three brothers that he started crying and asking his father to let him renounce Christianity and convert to Islam. At that moment, Constantin Brâncoveanu said: "Of our kind none have lost their faith. It is better to die a thousand times than to leave your ancient faith just to live few more years on earth." Matei listened and offered his head. After Brâncoveanu himself was decapitated, their heads were impaled on javelins and displayed in a procession. Their bodies were left before the gate and later on thrown into the waters of the Bosphorus.

== Cultural contribution ==
Brâncoveanu was a great patron of culture, his achievements being part of the Romanian and world cultural heritage. Under his reign, many Romanian, Greek, Bulgarian, Arabic, Turkish, and Georgian texts were printed after a printing press was established in Bucharest - an institution overseen by Anthim the Iberian. In 1694, he founded the Royal Academy of Bucharest.

In his religious and laic constructions, Brâncoveanu harmoniously combined in architecture the mural and sculptural painting, the local tradition, the Neo-Byzantine style and the innovative ideas of the Italian Renaissance, giving rise to Brâncovenesc style. The most accomplished and the best preserved example of Brâncovenesc style architecture is Hurezi monastery, inscribed by UNESCO on its list of World Heritage Sites, where Brâncoveanu intended to have his tomb. Other buildings built by him are Mogoșoaia Palace complex, Potlogi Palace, Brâncoveanu monastery. Such cultural ventures relied on increased taxation, which was also determined by the mounting fiscal pressure of the Ottomans (adding in turn to Brâncoveanu's determination to strip Wallachia of Turkish rule).

== Legacy ==
Brâncoveanu left to the secular Romanian spirituality a few fundamental books, printed for the first time in Wallachia; among them, Aristotle's Ethics, the Flower of the Gifts and the Philosophical Examples, the last two being translated and printed by Antim Ivireanul. The neo-Romanian style was born from the style of the monasteries, of the houses and of the palaces of Brâncoveanu and it became, through Ion Mincu and his school, the national style at the time of the affirmation of the cultural identities of the nations of Europe in the beginning of the 20th century.

The architectural Brâncovenesc style is found in the churches of the Monasteries of Hurezi, Râmnicu Sarat, Doicesti and New St. George Church in Bucharest. Among secular buildings, the style can be found in Mogosoaia palace and the reworked Old Court. The Brâncovenesc style was revived in the 20th century in form of the Romanian Revival style, also called "Neo-Brâncovenesc".

The Constantin Brâncoveanu University is located in Pitești, but it also has subsidiaries in Brăila and Râmnicu Vâlcea.

In June 1992, the Sinode of the Romanian Orthodox Church decreed the sanctification of Constantin Brâncoveanu, his sons Constantin, Radu, Ștefan and Matei, and vornic Ianache Văcărescu. On March 7, 2018, the decision of the Holy Synod of the Russian Orthodox Church added these saints to the calendar of the Russian Orthodox Church. On 16 August 2020, Romania celebrated for the first time the day of remembrance of the persecution of Christians in the world. Although Brâncoveanu died on 15 August, his death was also remembered for having refused to convert to Islam.

From the years 2000-2005, Brâncoveanu was featured on the 1000 Lei Coin, engraved by Vasile Gabor, as part of the third Leu. The coin, minted by the Romanian state mint, was made of 75% Magnesium and 25% Aluminum and was used in standard circulation. Even after the third Leu ended in 2005, the coin was still minted in an incredibly small quantity of 1000 in 2006, during the transition to the fourth Leu. From 2000-2004, the coin was both minted with the medal- and coin alignment, of which the medal aligned version tends to be more valuable for coin collectors. After 2004, the coin was only minted with the medal alignment.

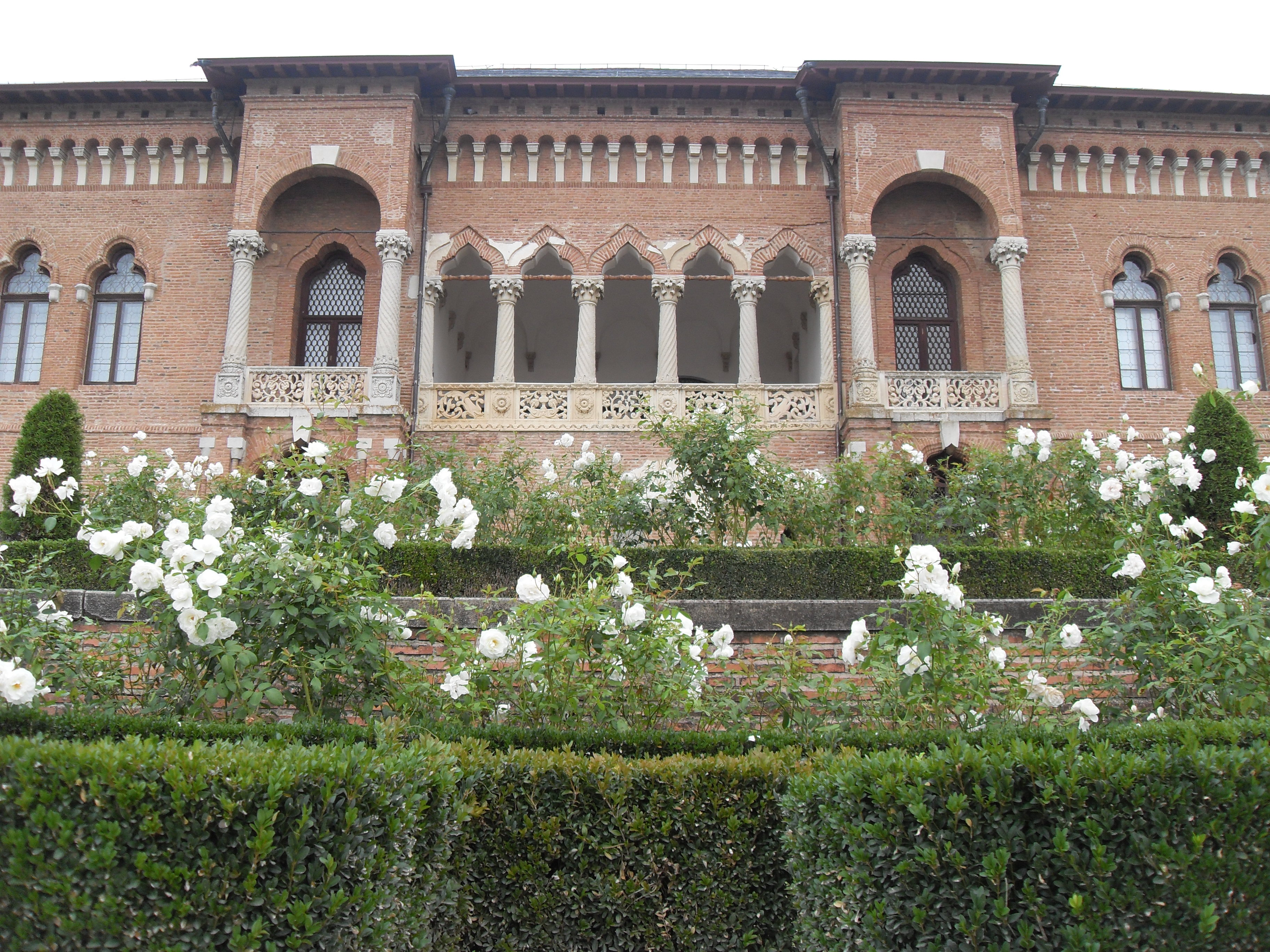
Mogoșoaia palace

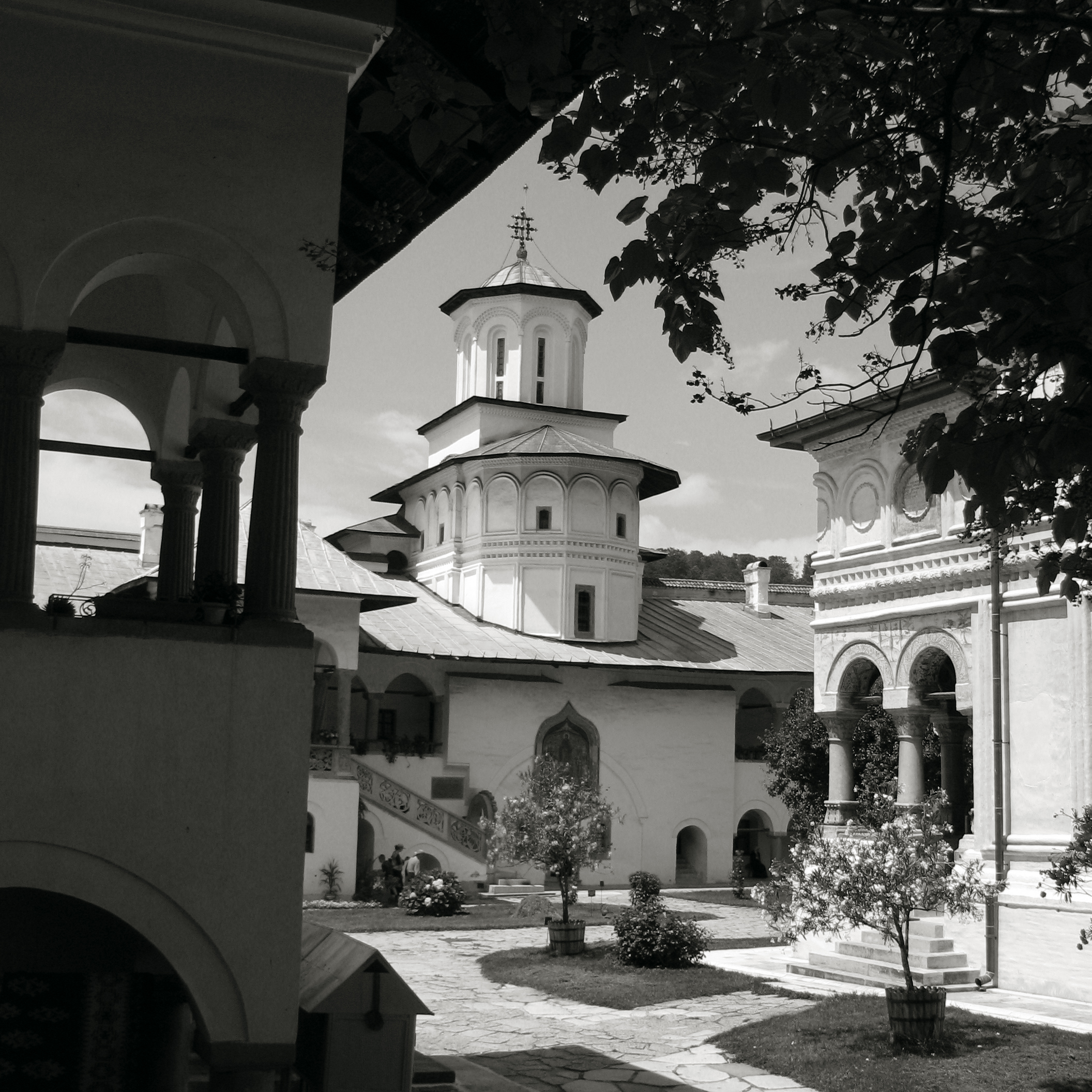
Horezu monastery

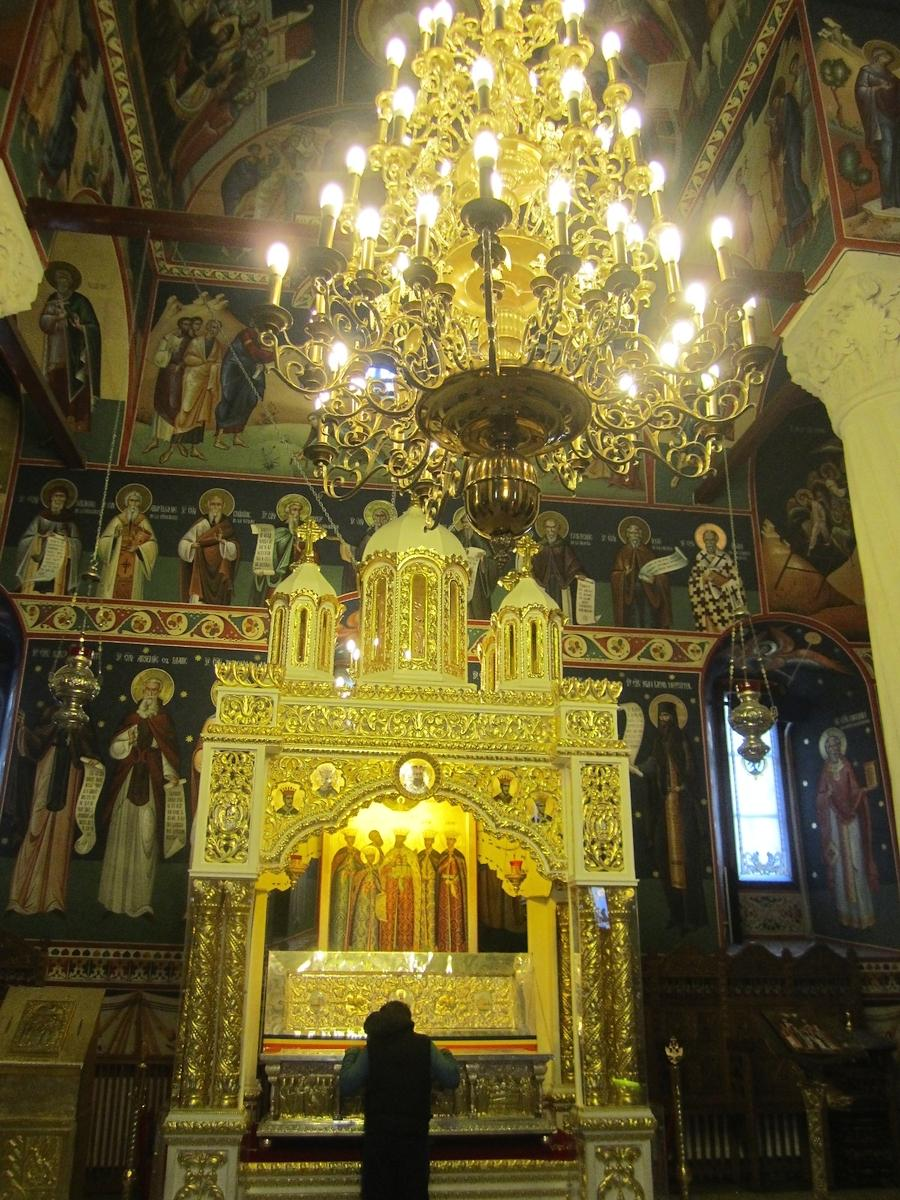
Brâncoveanu's tomb at New St. George Church

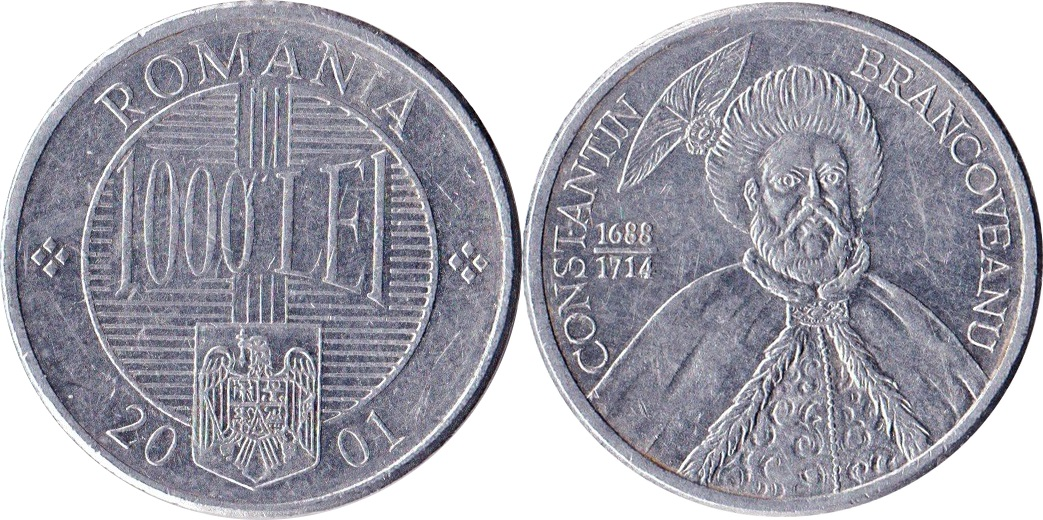
1000 Lei Coin from 2001

== Historiography ==
The intrigue marking Constantin's ascension and reign is reflected in chronicles of the time, which are ideologically divided: Letopisețul Cantacuzinesc gives a bleak account of Șerban's rule, as does Cronica Bălenilor; Radu Greceanu's is an official account of Brâncoveanu's rule, and Radu Popescu is adverse to Cantacuzino rulers.

Brâncoveni Monastery

Religion
- Affiliation: Eastern Orthodox
- Ecclesiastical or organisational status: Monastery
- Status: active

Location
- Location: Brâncoveni, Olt County, Romania

Architecture
- Architects: Patroness Celea (1570–83); Matei Basarab and Preda Brâncoveanu (1634–40); Constantin and Ștefan Brâncoveanu (1699–1704); Theodosius of Trebizond (1842)
- Type: Church
- Style: Brâncovenesc
- Groundbreaking: 1570
- Completed: 1842
- Direction of façade: West

Dimitrie Cantemir's Historia Hieroglyphica is centered on the clash, and reflects Cantemir's preference for Constantin Cantacuzino, who was also related to Dimitrie through marriage (despite the fact that Cantemir and Brâncoveanu have taken the same side in the conflict with the Porte).

Ștefan Cantacuzino's brief rule saw in turn the downfall of the Cantacuzinos; he and his father were executed by the Ottomans, who saw the solution to the risk of Wallacho-Russian alliances in imposing the rigid system of Phanariote rule (inaugurated in Wallachia by Nicholas Mavrocordato, who, through his previous rule in Moldavia, is also considered the first Phanariote in that country).

Through his death, Constantin Brâncoveanu became the hero of a series Romanian folk ballads, as well as being depicted on some of Romania's official coinage. According to the Romanian Orthodox Church, the reason for his and his sons' execution was their refusal to give up their Christian faith and convert to Islam. In 1992 the Church declared him, his sons, and Enache saints and martyrs (Sfinții Martiri Binecredinciosul Voievod Constantin Brâncoveanu, împreună cu fiii săi Constantin, Ștefan, Radu, Matei și sfetnicul Ianache - "The Martyr Saints the Right-Believing Voivode Constantin Brâncoveanu, together with his sons Constantin, Ștefan, Radu, Matei, and the counselor [Enache]"). Their feast day is August 16.

== Quotes ==
- Letopisețul Cantacuzinesc on Constantin Brâncoveanu's relations with the Habsburgs and Ottomans early in his reign (1690, during the latter stages of the Great Turkish War):

[...] Then Costandin-vodă [old rendition of his name] as well, arriving to his seat in Bucharest, catching news of the Austrians having entered his country and having reached Târgoviște, immediately left his seat [...] went forth towards Pitariului Bridge, setting camp in the river meadow of Plătăreşti, leaving behind the ispravnic [...] with orders that, when the Austrians were to arrive in Bucharest, he was to provide them with all supplies they would need.

Subsequently [the Austrian General], upon understanding this [action], immediately sent a letter to Costandin-vodă, inviting him to return to his seat and join [the Austrians] in harassing the Turk.

Then Costandin-vodă, upon understanding this, called as soon as he could the Metropolitan Theodosie, as well as all his lower and higher boyars, summoning a great council on what was to be done, whereupon some of the boyars vigorously showed themselves to favor Costandin-vodă's rejection of the Turks and his joining the Austrians; while another bunch of boyars, foremost Costandin [Constantin] Cantacuzino, who has been great stolnic, and Mihai Cantacuzino, the great spătar, believed this not to constitute good advice, as, where such a thing to happen, the nearby Tatars [who were Ottoman allies] would immediately arrive with a mighty force in order to enslave and plunder the country, and the Austrians would prove of no help. And immediately they moved spot and went to the village of Ruși, where the princely fish ponds are located.

Then [the Austrian General] came to Drăgănești, inviting Costandin-vodă to leave Ruși and meet him in Drăgănești, showing himself a great friend towards Costandin-vodă, asking him, in all good faith, to teach him what he should do next. And he told all the truth about how his and his troops' arrival had been brought about by the lies of [a high boyar], and how [the boyar] had boasted that, were [they] to enter the country, all boyars and all country would pay allegiance to [them], but that this had not in fact happened.

Thus Costandin-vodă told him the whole truth, about how the Tatars wished to enter his country, and [he] threw a major banquet in his honor and then returned to Bucharest in great fear. And the Tatars, aware of the Austrian presence, wasted no time in raising troops for the Sultan and sent forth messengers to Costandin-vodă, telling him that they were to come in the country to fight the Austrians.

Thus Costandin-vodă, upon hearing news of this, became very saddened, most of all considering the plight of the poor country, and immediately lifted camp and left for Buzău. And when he arrived there, he sent his Lady and all her ladies-in-waiting to the convent [...], and he rode with a few of his men to meet the Sultan, paying him high allegiance and offering him many gifts.

It is then that the Sultan saw that Costandin-vodă was not being rebellious, but rather [his] honest servant, and gave him assurance that his country would not be enslaved, and that [the Ottomans] were instead to meet the Austrians, who were their enemies.

== Issue ==
Brâncoveanu and his wife Marica had seven daughters and four sons. Although all of his sons were murdered, many of his daughters had issue. Brâncoveanu's first born, Constantin II, also had a son who survived exile and rose to be a mare ban (foremost state function in Wallachian political hierarchy, except for the ruler). The male line of the Brâncoveanu family became extinguished in 1832, when Grigore Brâncoveanu died without having any children of his own. Yet he adopted a relative (who was also a descendant of Constantin Brâncoveanu) and thus passed the family name on.

According to a genealogical study, roughly 250 of his bloodline were alive at the middle of the 19th century. Amongst them Gheorghe Bibescu and Barbu Știrbei (rulers of Wallachia and Moldova), famous revolutionary Alexandru Ipsilanti, Romanian Prime ministers Barbu Catargiu, Nicolae Kretzulescu, George Manu and Gheorghe Grigore Cantacuzino "Nababul" and historians Dan and Mihnea Berindei.

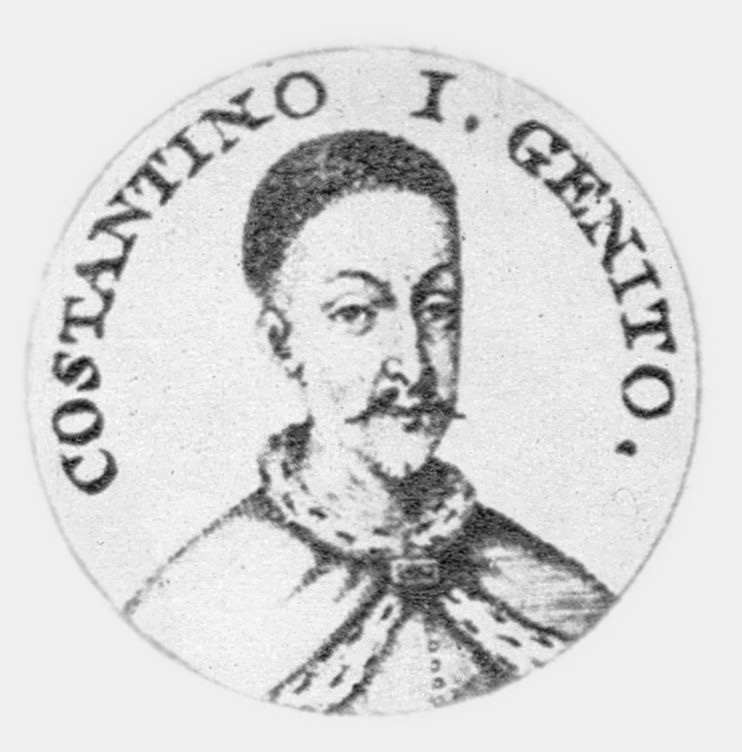
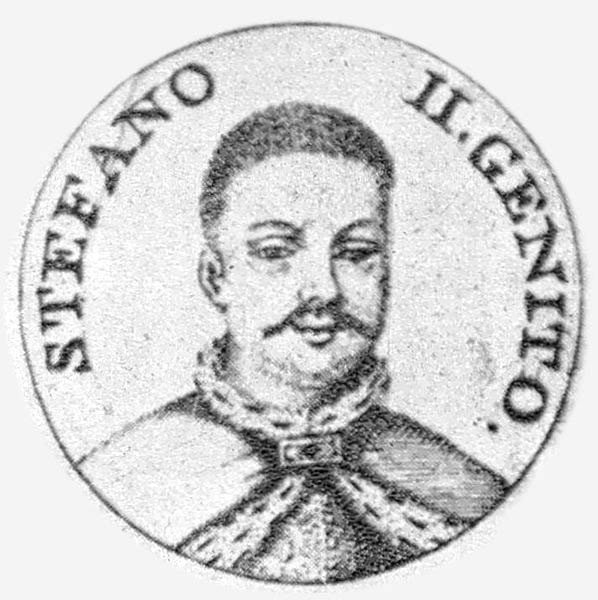
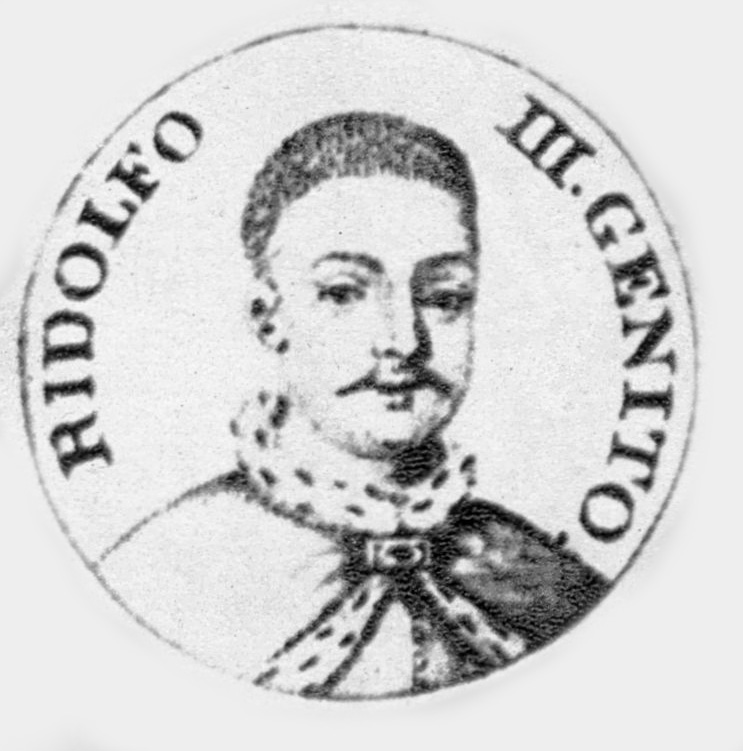
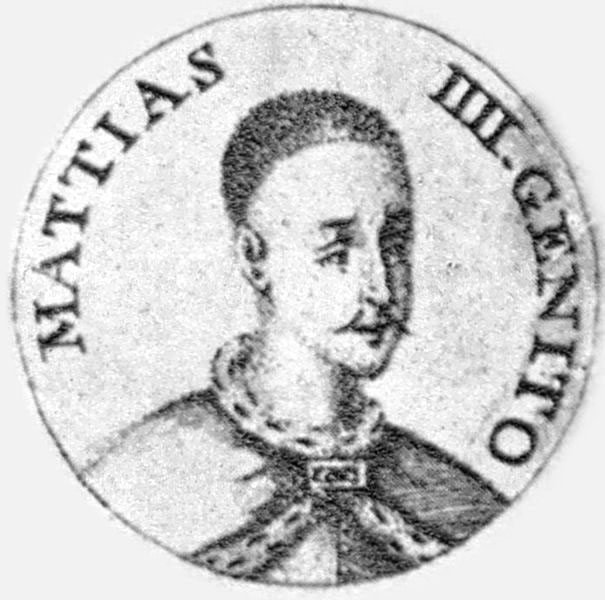
Name	Portrait	Lived	Wife (date of marriage)	Offspring	Comments
Constantin II Brâncoveanu		1683-1714	Anița, daughter of Ion Balș, Moldavian boyar. (20 January 1706)	Constantin III (mare ban)	Constantin II was Brâncoveanu's first son, albeit not his first offspring. He had one son, Constantin III, who was spared by the Ottomans: he later engaged in politics and furthered the family's name.
Ștefan Brâncoveanu		1685-1714	Bălașa, daughter of Ilie Cantacuzino. (27 February 1709)	Maria	Ștefan was noted for his accomplished classical education. He is the author of several books in ancient Greek. His line ended with his daughter, who bore no children.
Radu Brâncoveanu		n/a-1714	Engaged to a daughter of Antioh Cantemir, former Moldavian ruler, but the planned marriage didn't come to fruition in light of the 1714 events.
Matei Brâncoveanu		1702-1714	At the time of his death 11 or 12 years of age. A number of more and less reliable accounts of the August 1714 martyrdom state that he made a plea for his life, but his father convinced him not to trade his faith for his life. Was killed in front of his father.
Source: If nothing else mentioned, Chiriță 1932

== Bibliography ==
- Berindei, Dan (1989), "Urmașii lui Constantin Brâncoveanu și locul lor în societatea românească. Genealogie și istorie", in Cernovodeanu, Paul și Constantiniu Florin (ed.), Constantin Brâncoveanu, București: Editura Academiei Republicii Socialiste România, pp. 275–285
- Boia, Lucian (2001), History and Myth in Romanian Consciousness, Traducere în limba engleză de James Christian Brown, Budapesta: Central European University Press
- Busuioceanu, Andrei (1989), "Constantin Brâncoveanu în viziunea istoriografiei române și străine", in Cernovodeanu, Paul și Constantiniu Florin (ed.), Constantin Brâncoveanu, București: Editura Academiei Republicii Socialiste România, pp. 9–23
- Cantemir, Dimitrie (1927), Lupta dintre Inorog și Corb (Istoria ieroglifică), București: Institutul de Arte Grafice "România Nouă"
- Cernovodeanu, Paul (1989), "Coordonatele politicii externe a lui Constantin Brâncoveanu", in Cernovodeanu, Paul și Constantiniu Florin (ed.), Constantin Brâncoveanu, București: Editura Academiei Republicii Socialiste România, pp. 275–285
- Chiriță, Ilie (September–December 1932), "Urmașii lui Brâncoveanu-Vodă", Arhivele Olteniei, (anul XI) (63–64): 303–318
- Del Chiaro Fiorentino, Anton-Maria (2005), Revoluțiile Valahiei, Traducere din anul 1929 de S. Cris-Cristian, Iași: Editura Tehnopress
- Giurescu, Constantin; Dobrescu, N. (1907), Documente și regeste privitoare la Constantin Brâncoveanu, București: Inst. de Arte Grafice Carol Göbl
- Giurescu, Constantin C. (1946a), Istoria Românilor. Volumul III, Partea întâi. Dela moartea lui Mihai Viteazul până la sfârșitul Epocei fanariote (1601-1821), Ediția a doua, revăzută și adăogită, București: Fundația Regală pentru Literatură și Artă
- Giurescu, Constantin C. (1946b), Istoria Românilor. Volumul III, Partea a doua. Dela moartea lui Mihai Viteazul până la sfârșitul Epocei fanariote (1601-1821), București: Fundația Regală pentru Literatură și Artă
- Greceanu, Radu logofătul (1970), Istoria Domniei lui Constantin Basarab Brîncoveanu Voievod (1688-1714), Studiu introductiv și ediție critică întocmite de Aurora Ilieș, București: Editura Academiei Republicii Socialiste România
- Grecianu, Radu (1906), Viața lui Costandin Vodă Brâncoveanu, Note și anexe de Ștefan D. Grecianu, București: Inst. de Arte Grafice "Carol Göbl"
- Ionescu, Ștefan; Panait, Panait I. (1969), Costandin Vodă Brîncoveanu: Viața. Domnia. Epoca, București: Editura științifică
- Iorga, N. (1899), Socotelile Sibiiului, Bucuresci: Institutul de Arte Grafice Carol Göbl Estras din Analele Academieĭ Române. Seria II. Tom XXI
- Iorga, N. (1914a), Activitatea culturală a lui Constantin Vodă Brâncoveanu și scopurile Academiei Române, Extras din Analele Academiei Române. Seria II. Tom XXXVII, București: Socec
- Iorga, N. (1914b), Constantin Brîncoveanu (dramă în cinci acte), Vălenii de Munte: Tipogr. "Neamul Romănesc"
- Iorga, N. (1914c), Valoarea politică a lui Constantin Vodă Brîncoveanu. Conferință ținută la Ateneul Romîn din București în ziua de 15 August 1914, Vălenii-de-Munte: Tipografia «Neamul Romănesc»
- Iorga, N (1930), Domnii Români, După portrete și fresce contemporane adunate și publicate de președintele comisiunii N. Iorga, Sibiiu: Editura și Tiparul Krafft & Drotleff S.A. pentru Arte Grafice, pp. XII–XIII, 130–139
- Iorga, N. (1938), Istoria Românilor. Vol. VI: Monarhii, București
- Iorga, N. (1972), Bizanț după Bizanț, Traducere de Liliana Iorga-Pippidi, Postfață de Virgil Cândea, București: Editura Enciclopedică Română, pp. 181–190
- Lupaș, I. (1941), Studii, conferințe și comunicări istorice. Volumul III, Sibiu: Tipografia "Cartea Românească" din Cluj, pp. 3–46
- Pippidi, Andrei (1989), "Un episod al relațiilor româno-engleze: Corespondența lui Constantin Brâncoveanu cu lordul Paget", in Cernovodeanu, Paul și Constantiniu Florin (ed.), Constantin Brâncoveanu, București: Editura Academiei Republicii Socialiste România, pp. 139–155
- Rezachevici, Constantin (1989), Constantin Brâncoveanu. Zărnești 1690, București: Editura Militară, p. 33
- Stoicescu, Nicolae (1971), Dicționar al Marilor Dregători din Țara Românească și Moldova în sec. XIV-XVII, București: Editura enciclopedică română, pp. 412–413
- Șerban, Constantin (1969), Constantin Brîncoveanu, București: Editura Tineretului
- Țighiliu, Iolanda (1989), "Domeniul lui Constantin Brâncoveanu", in Cernovodeanu, Paul și Constantiniu Florin (ed.), Constantin Brâncoveanu, București: Editura Academiei Republicii Socialiste România, pp. 74–94
- Vîrtosu, Emil (1942), Foletul Novel. Calendarul lui Constantin Vodă Brăncoveanu 1693-1704, București
- Xenopol, A. D. (1929), Istoria românilor din Dacia Traiană, Volumul VIII: Domnia lui C. Brancovanu (1689-1714), Ediția a III-a, revăzută de autor, îngrijită și ținută la curent de I. Vlădescu, București: Editura «Cartea Românească», pp. 7–76

Preceded by Șerban Cantacuzino	Prince of Wallachia; 1688–1714	Succeeded by Ștefan Cantacuzino
