= Doamna Marica Brâncoveanu =

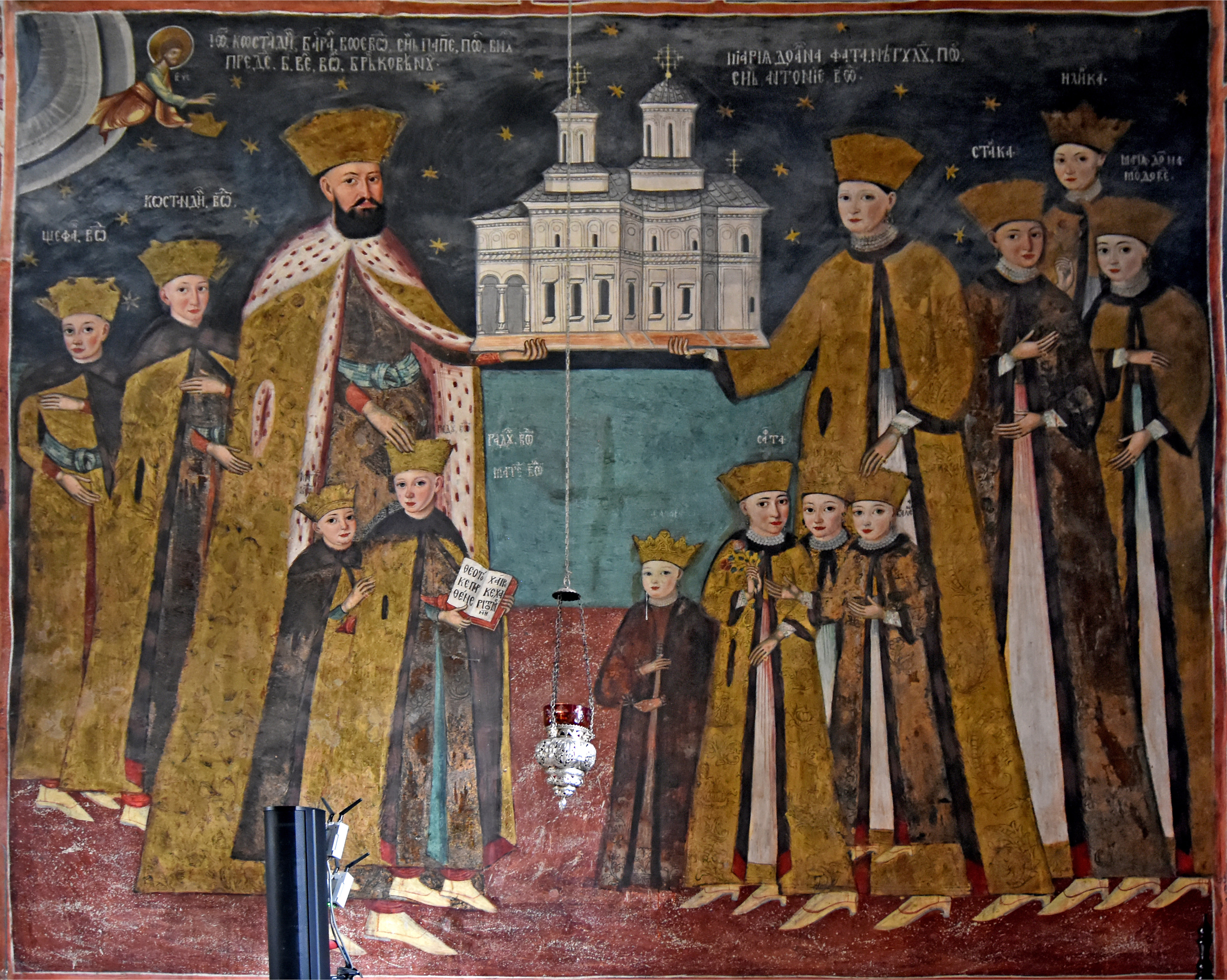
Marica Brancoveanu and her Family, Votive Painting.

Doamna Marica Brâncoveanu (circa 1661, Ploiești – 1729, Surpatele Monastery) was a princess consort of Wallachia by marriage to Constantin Brancoveanu (r. 1688–1714). Her father was Neagu, son of the Wallachian prince Antonie of Popești (r.1669-72) and Necșuța.

She married Constantin Brancoveanu in 1674. She supported and actively participated in the culture policy of her spouse. She had books printed in Romanian, Greek, Slavic, Arabic, Turkic and Georgian, and founded libraries with Western books. She is especially known for her support to the St Sava convent. After the deposition of her spouse in 1714, she was brought as a prisoner to Constantinople by the Ottomans along with the rest of her family. Her spouse and sons were murdered. She was eventually released, and exiled to Kutai, near the eastern shore of the Black Sea. She was allowed to return to Bucharest in 1716. In 1720, she managed to have the remains of her spouse and sons brought back to Wallachia and buried.

In 2025 she was canonized by the Romanian Orthodox Church along with 16 other women.

Preceded by Maria Rustea-Văleanu	Princess consort of Wallachia; 1688–1714	Păuna Greceanu-Cantacuzino
