= Nicholas Mavrocordatos =

Phanariote Prince of Wallachia (1670–1730)

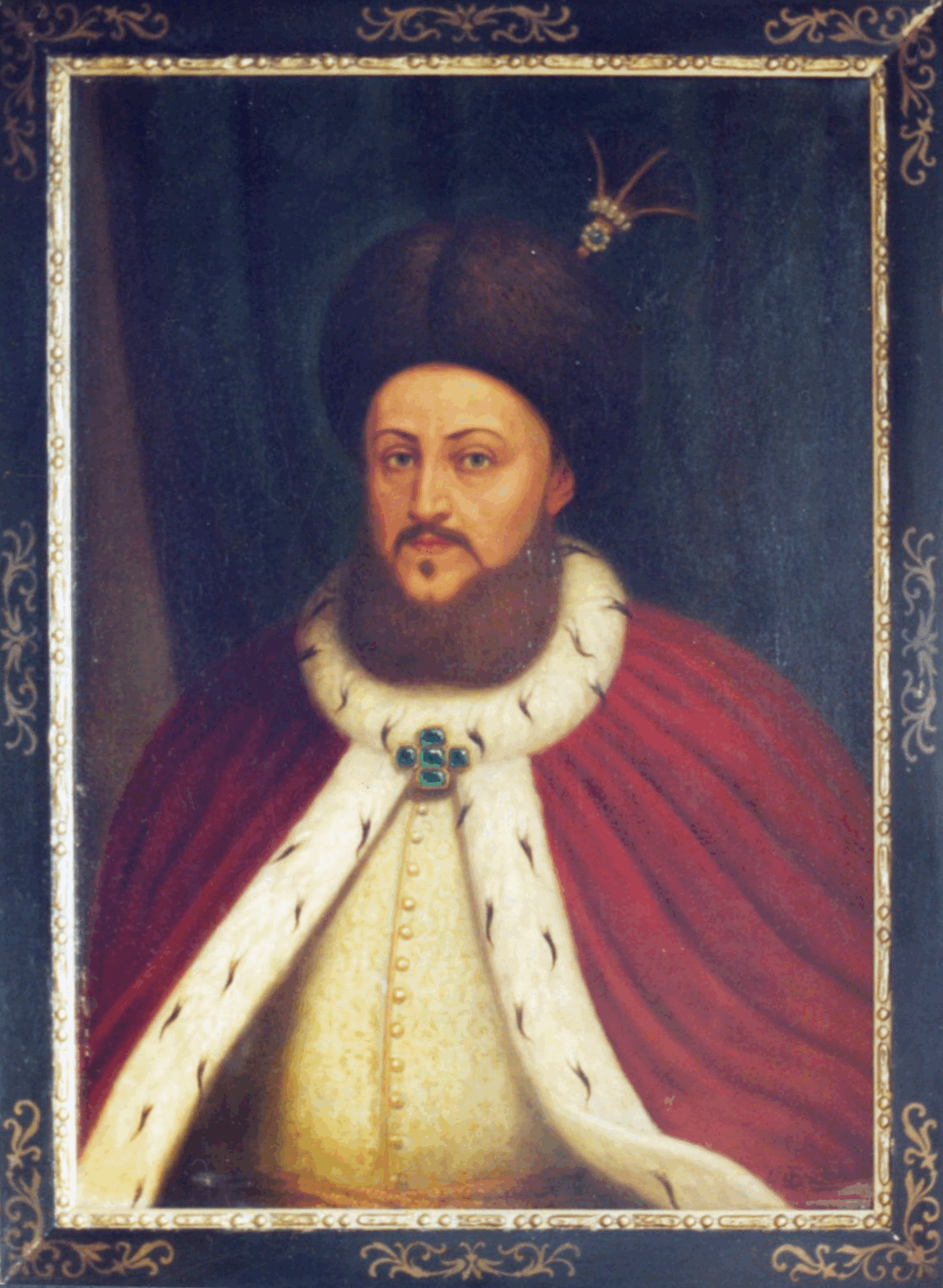
- Portrait by unknown, early 18th century

Prince of Moldavia (1st reign)
- Reign: 25 January – 21 November 1710
- Predecessor: Mihai Racoviță
- Successor: Dimitrie Cantemir

Prince of Moldavia (2nd reign)
- Reign: 8 November 1711 – 25 December 1715
- Predecessor: John Mavrocordatos
- Successor: Mihai Racoviță

Prince of Wallachia (1st reign)
- Reign: 26 December 1715 – 25 November 1716
- Predecessor: Ștefan Cantacuzino
- Successor: John Mavrocordatos

Prince of Wallachia (2nd reign)
- Reign: March 1719 – 3 September 1730
- Predecessor: John Mavrocordatos
- Successor: Constantine Mavrocordatos
- Born: 3 May 1670; Constantinople, Ottoman Empire
- Died: 3 September 1730 (aged 60); Bucharest, Wallachia
- Spouse: Casandra Cantacuzino; Pulcheria Tzouki; Smaranda Stavropoleos
- Issue: Constantine and John
- House: Mavrocordatos
- Father: Alexander Mavrocordatos
- Mother: Soultana Chrusoskolaiou
- Religion: Orthodox

Nicholas Mavrocordatos (Greek: Νικόλαος Μαυροκορδάτος, Romanian: Nicolae Mavrocordat; May 3, 1670 – September 3, 1730) was a Greek member of the Mavrocordatos family, Grand Dragoman to the Divan (1697), and consequently the first Phanariot Hospodar of the Danubian Principalities, Prince of Moldavia, and Prince of Wallachia (both on two occasions). He was succeeded as Grand Dragoman (1709) by his brother John Mavrocordato (Ioan), who was for a short while hospodar in both Wallachia and Moldavia.

== Reigns ==
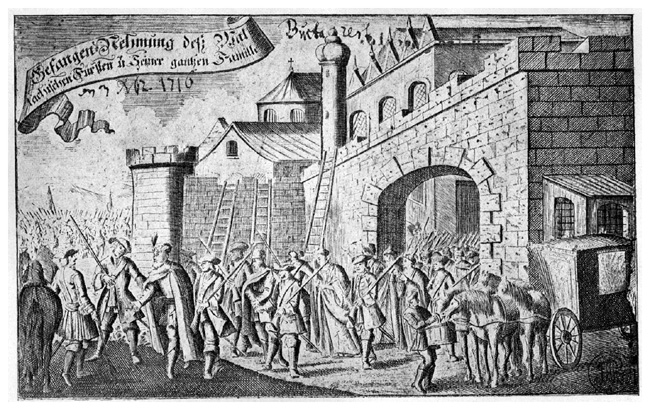
Mavrocordatos being captured by Habsburg troops (1716), as imagined in an Imperial gazette of the time.

Mavrocordatos was born in Constantinople. Deposed as Prince (Hospodar & Voievode) of Moldavia in favor of Dimitrie Cantemir, owing to the suspicions of his Ottoman overlord, Sultan Ahmed III, he was restored in 1711 (after Cantemir's rebellion during the Russo-Turkish War of 1710-1711), and, for this second rule, is considered the first in a line of Phanariotes in Moldavia (indicating that the election by the traditional Moldavian council of boyars was no longer enforced).

Soon afterwards, he was replaced by Mihai Racoviță and became ruler of Wallachia, being thus the first Phanariot in that country – after the Porte decided to regulate the same system following the rebellion of Ștefan Cantacuzino. According to Anton Maria Del Chiaro, the Florentine secretary to Constantin Brâncoveanu (predecessor and rival of Ștefan Cantacuzino), Mavrocordatos tortured and otherwise persecuted Wallachian boyars who had supported the Cantacuzinos, and also ordered the execution of Ștefan's son. He was also noted for awarding tax exemptions to the majority of high-ranking boyars, as one of the first rulers to concede to the growth of monetary economy and the decay of manorialism.

In 1716, during the Austro-Turkish War, Mavrocordatos attempted to resist Habsburg invasion, but was betrayed by his boyars and had to flee to the Ottoman-held town of Rousse. He returned to Bucharest with Ottoman assistance, and executed a number of his adversaries, including Lupu Costachi, but was deposed by the troops of Prince Eugene of Savoy after the raid on Bucharest, and was held prisoner in Braşov and Sibiu.

Replaced by his brother John until 1719, he was restored after the Peace of Passarowitz through which the country lost its westernmost part, Oltenia, to the Habsburgs; Nicholas' second ascension followed a period of major distress, including a bubonic plague outbreak and a major fire in Bucharest (it is possible that John himself had died as a result of the epidemic). Prince Nicholas died while in office in Bucharest; he was succeeded as prince of Wallachia in 1730 by his son Constantine Mavrocordatos, who would rule Wallachia six times and Moldavia five times until 1769.

Through his mother, Soultana Chrysoskolaiou, who was a member of the Greek Phanariot family Chrisoscoleos, Mavrocordatos was distantly related to Alexandru Lăpușneanu.

== Cultural achievements ==
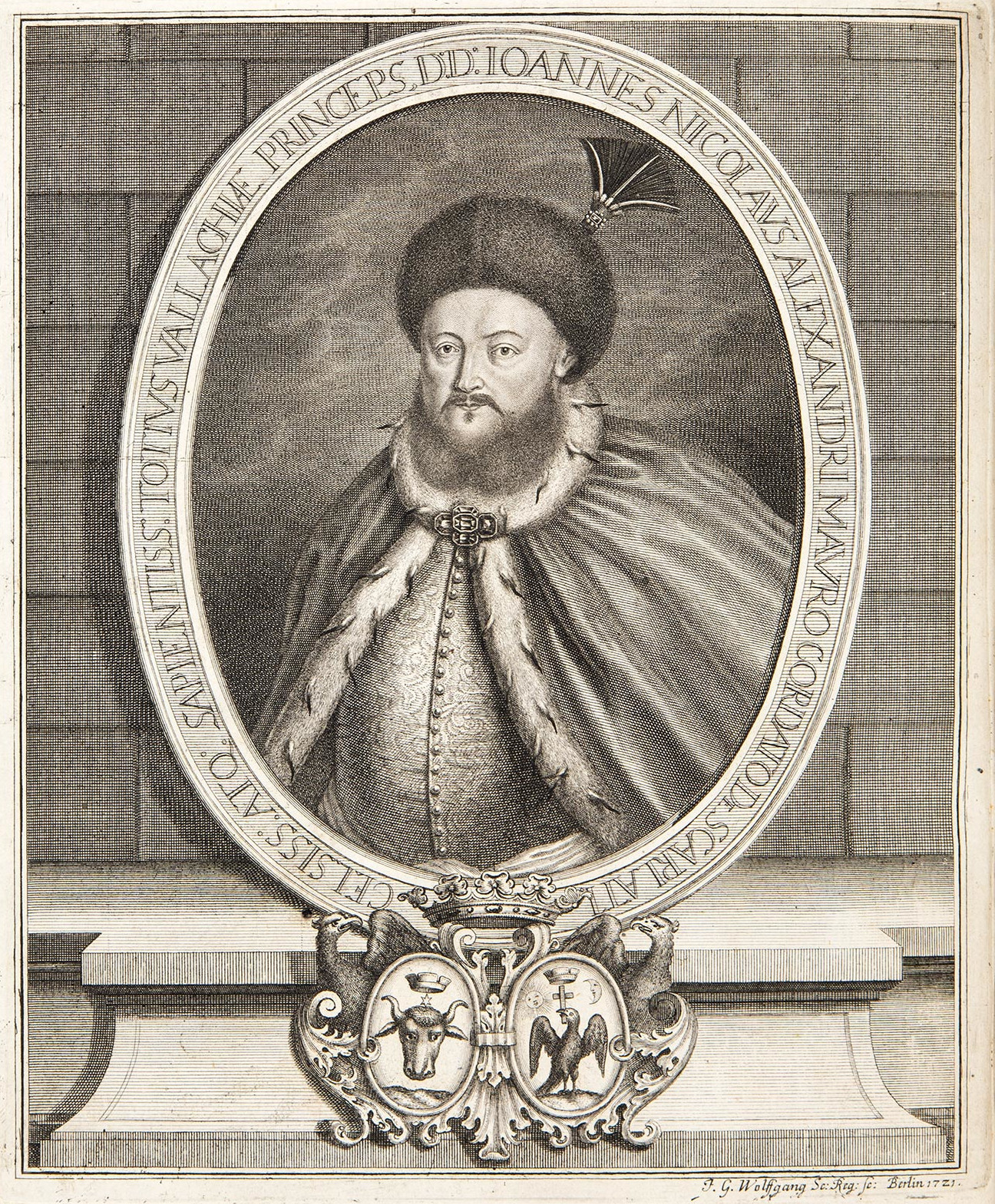
Engraving of Nicholas Mavrocordatos by Johann Georg Wolfgang, 1721

Nicholas Mavrocordatos was the first in a line of rulers appointed directly by the Porte. He introduced Greek manners, the Greek language and Greek costume, and set up a splendid court on the Byzantine model. At the same time, Mavrocordatos was influenced by the Age of Enlightenment, the founder of libraries, the builder of the monumental Văcărești Monastery and of the Stavropoleos Church, and himself the author of an original work entitled Peri kathekonton / Liber de Officiis (Bucharest, 1719). He wrote also the first Greek novel, Philotheou Parerga / The Leisures of Philotheos.

A polyglot, he surrounded himself with savants from several parts of Europe, including Daniel de Fonseca and Stephan Bergler; his library was among the continent's most treasured. Mavrocordatos engaged in a correspondence with major religious figures of his time, including Jean Leclerc, William Wake, Archbishop of Canterbury, and Chrysanthus, Orthodox Patriarch of Jerusalem; the first volume written by an author from the Danubian Principalities to be published in England was Mavrocordatos', and it is during his last rule in Wallachia that a more intimate knowledge of politics and society in the Kingdom of Great Britain became evident in historical records kept by locals (the chronicler Radu Popescu recorded the accession of George II as King of Great Britain). He died in Bucharest, aged 60.

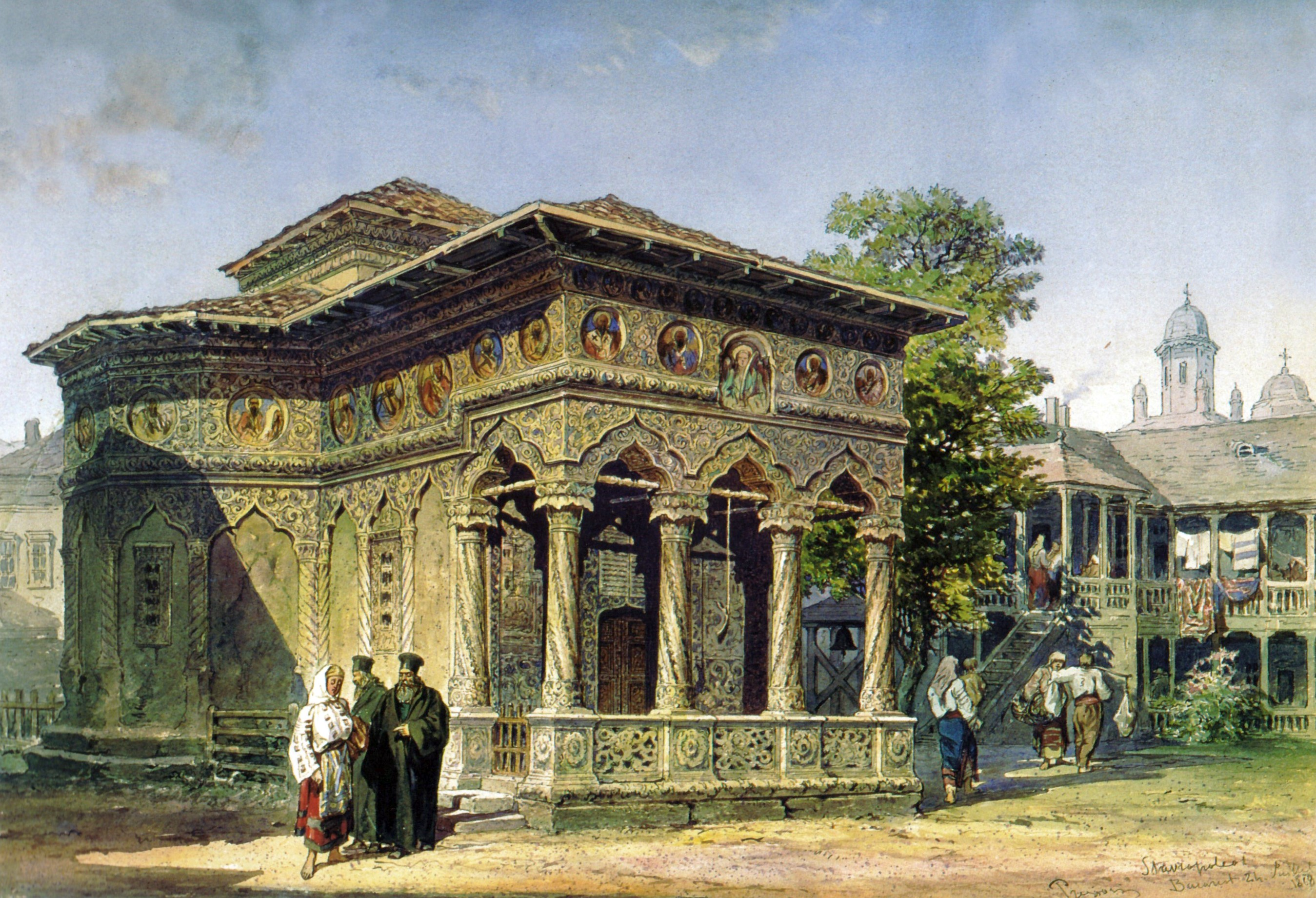
Stavropoleos Church, in an 1868 lithograph by Amadeo Preziosi

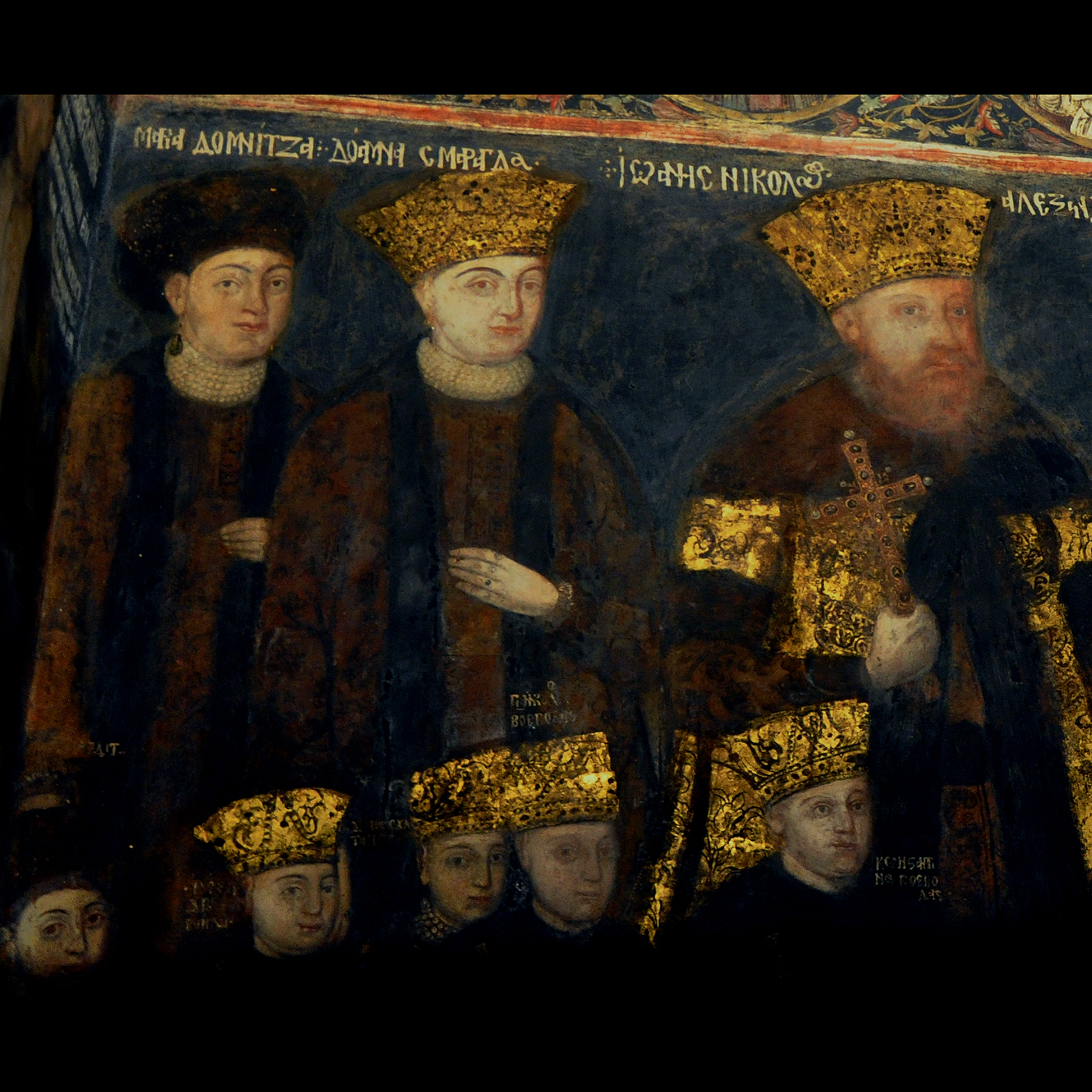
Nicholas Mavrocordatos and family, votive painting in Stavropoleos Monastery

== Literature ==
- Constantin C. Giurescu, Istoria Bucureștilor. Din cele mai vechi timpuri pînă în zilele noastre. Ed. Pentru Literatură, Bucharest, 1966, p. 94-96.
- Neagu Djuvara, Între Orient și Occident. Țările române la începutul epocii moderne. Humanitas, Bucharest, 1995, p. 31, 47f., 69, 92.
- (in Romanian) Paul Cernovodeanu, "București-Canterbury via Amesterdam", in Magazin Istoric, September 1997.
- (in Romanian) Anton Maria Del Chiaro, Revoluțiile Valahiei.

Preceded by Alexander Mavrocordatos	Grand Dragoman of the Porte; 1697–1709	Succeeded by John Mavrocordatos
Preceded by Ioan Buhuș	Prince of Moldavia; 1709–1710	Succeeded by Dimitrie Cantemir
Preceded by John Mavrocordatos	Prince of Moldavia; 1711–1715	Succeeded by Mihai Racoviță
Preceded by Ștefan Cantacuzino	Prince of Wallachia; 1715–1716	Succeeded by John Mavrocordatos
Preceded by John Mavrocordatos	Prince of Wallachia; 1719–1730	Succeeded by Constantine Mavrocordatos
