= Elena Cantacuzino =

Elena Cantacuzino (also Elina, Ilinca) (1611–1687) was a Wallachian noble.

She was the daughter of Radu Șerban and educated in Vienna. She married the official Constantin Cantacuzino, with whom she had several children, among them Șerban Cantacuzino. She and her spouse became known for their building projects and the reparations of especially convents and churches. In 1663, her spouse was murdered in a coup. She sent her children abroad and protected the family property. Upon the installation of Antonie din Popeşti to power, she came into an influential position. She was able to have her son appointed governor and the murderers of her spouse punished and the name of her spouse cleared. In 1682, she became the first female in what is now Romania to write a will.
