= Anton Maria Del Chiaro =

Italian historian

Anton Maria Del Chiaro (born in 1669, died after 1727) was a Florentine Italian secretary of Constantin Brâncoveanu, the Prince of Wallachia.

He is the author of a book on the history of Wallachia of his time, called Istoria delle moderne rivoluzioni della Valachia ("History of Modern Revolutions of Walachia"), dedicated to Pope Clement XI, written in Italian, and printed in Venice in 1718.

== Biography ==
Much of what we know about Antonio Maria Del Chiaro is owed to Constantin Boroianu's well-documented article, “Nouvelles données sur Del Chiaro”, published in the Romanian journal Revue des Études sud-est européennes in 1972.

Born in 1669, as David Teglia in a Jewish family of Livorno, Del Chiaro was converted and baptized Catholic at the age of 14 on December 17, 1683, at the Duomo of Florence; as it was customary, he took the name of his godfather, Leon Battista Del Chiaro. Antonio Maria Del Chiaro studied for a long time in Tuscany and Padua. Around 1700, he settled in Venice where he met Apostolo Zeno, Antonio Vallisneri, and other scholars. In 1709, he was invited to come to Wallachia where Prince Constantin Brancovan (Brâncoveanu) was looking for a secretary. He arrived in Bucharest in 1710.

After Brancovan's deposition and death in 1714, Del Chiaro remained in Wallachia as a teacher of Italian and Latin for some young princes. As a diplomatic secretary, he served the new prince, Ștefan Cantacuzino, and his successor Nicolae Mavrocordato. When, in 1716, Mavrocordato was deposed by the troops of Prince Eugene of Savoy, and held prisoner, Del Chiaro accompanied him to Hermannstadt (Sibiu), then returned to Venice in 1717, where he began to write his main work, Istoria delle moderne rivoluzioni della Valachia, which was issued the following year.

Around the end of 1718 or in early 1719, Antonio Maria Del Chiaro, for unexplained reasons, settled in London, but did not succeed to live well there, and he soon became short of money. However, it is not before 1726 that he chose to come back to Italy, where he had to ask for financial support from his friend Apostolo Zeno; he took the position of a teacher of Latin, rhetoric and history in Portoferraio, in the Island of Elba. After 1727, we lose track of him.
