= Ștefan Cantacuzino =

Prince of Wallachia (1675–1716)

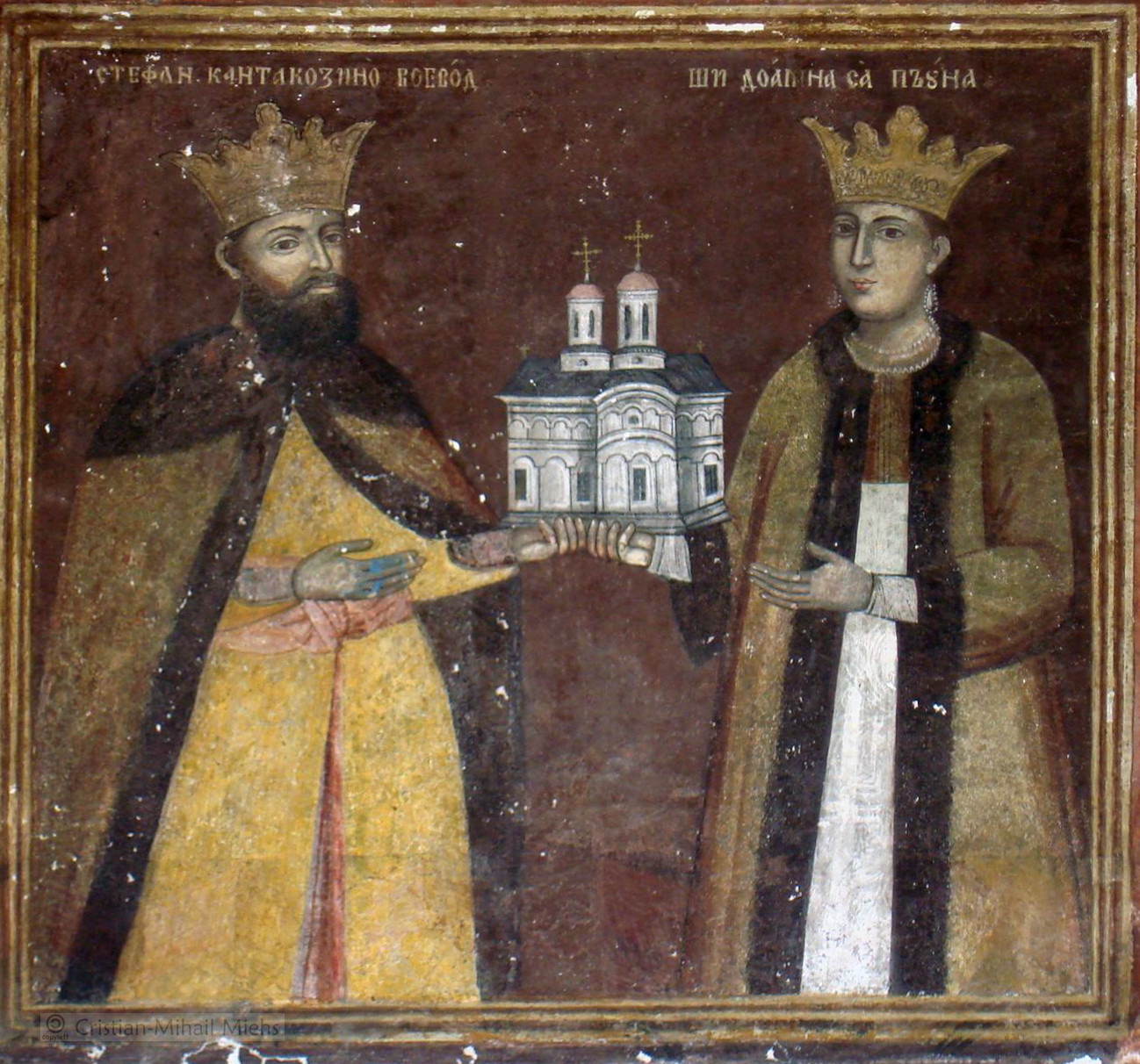
- Ștefan Cantacuzino on the left

Prince of Wallachia
- Reign: April 1714 – 21 January 1716
- Predecessor: Constantin Brâncoveanu
- Successor: Nicholas Mavrocordatos
- Born: c. 1675
- Died: 7 June 1716; Constantinople
- Spouse: Păuna Greceanu
- House: Cantacuzino family
- Father: Constantin Cantacuzino
- Religion: Orthodox

Ștefan Cantacuzino, (c. 1675 – 7 June 1716) was a Prince of Wallachia between April 1714 and January 21, 1716, the son of stolnic Constantin Cantacuzino. He was married to Păuna Greceanu-Cantacuzino.

== Biography ==
Ștefan Cantacuzino was born around 1675 into the Cantacuzino family, one of the most powerful noble houses in Wallachia. His father, Constantin Cantacuzino, was a noted scholar, diplomat, and political figure.

In 1714, after the deposition and execution of Constantin Brâncoveanu by the Ottoman Empire, Ștefan Cantacuzino was appointed prince with Ottoman support. His short reign was marked by efforts to navigate the complex political pressures between the Ottoman Empire and the Habsburg Monarchy.

As the Austro-Turkish War (1716–1718) broke out, Ștefan attempted to align Wallachia with the Habsburgs, secretly sending information to Vienna. When his contacts with the Habsburgs were discovered, the Ottomans deposed him. He and his father were taken to Istanbul and executed in 1716.

== Legacy ==
Ștefan Cantacuzino’s downfall marked the end of native rule in Wallachia and the beginning of the Phanariote regime, during which Greek-origin rulers appointed by the Ottoman Porte governed the region. His tragic fate symbolized the decline of Wallachian autonomy under Ottoman domination.

== Family ==
He was married to Păuna Greceanu, with whom he had several children. The Cantacuzino family remained influential in Romanian political and cultural life in later centuries.

== See also ==
- Cantacuzino family

Preceded by Constantin Brâncoveanu	Prince of Wallachia; 1714–1716	Succeeded by Nicholas Mavrocordatos
