= Păuna Greceanu-Cantacuzino =

Păuna Greceanu-Cantacuzino (died 1740) was a princess consort of Wallachia by marriage to Ștefan Cantacuzino (r. 1714–1716), the last land lord of Wallachia before the establishment of the Phanariot reigns.

She is described as ambitious, dominant, and actively involved in the foreign policy and actions regarding the deposition of the former prince and the installation of her spouse to the throne. After having entered into negotiations with the Habsburgs, however, the Ottomans deposed her spouse, and he was taken to Constantinople and executed.

Preceded by Doamna Marica Brâncoveanu	Princess consort of Wallachia; 1714–1716	Zaphira Guliano
