= Oltenia =

Oltenia Lesser Wallachia
- Historical region of Romania
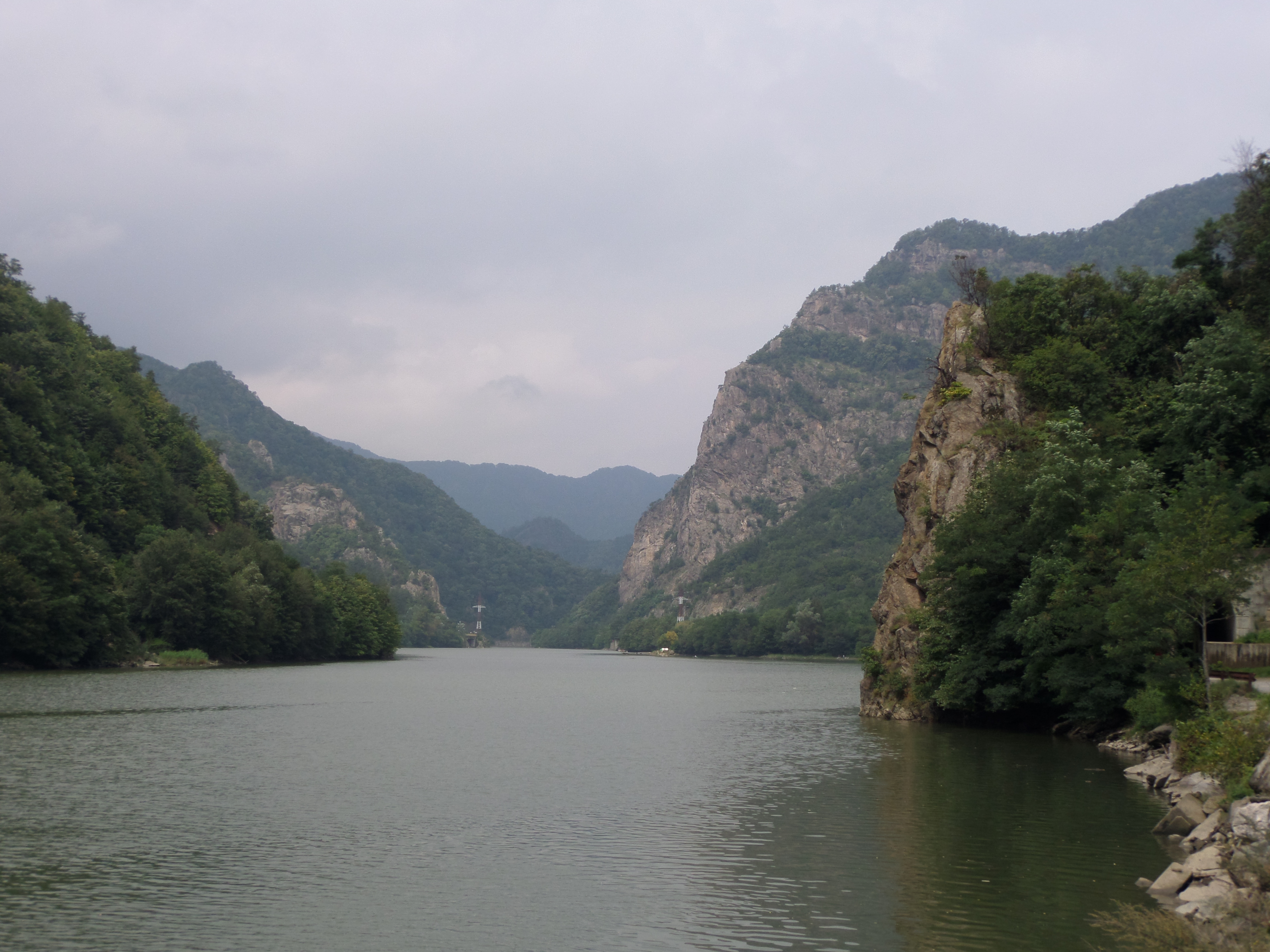
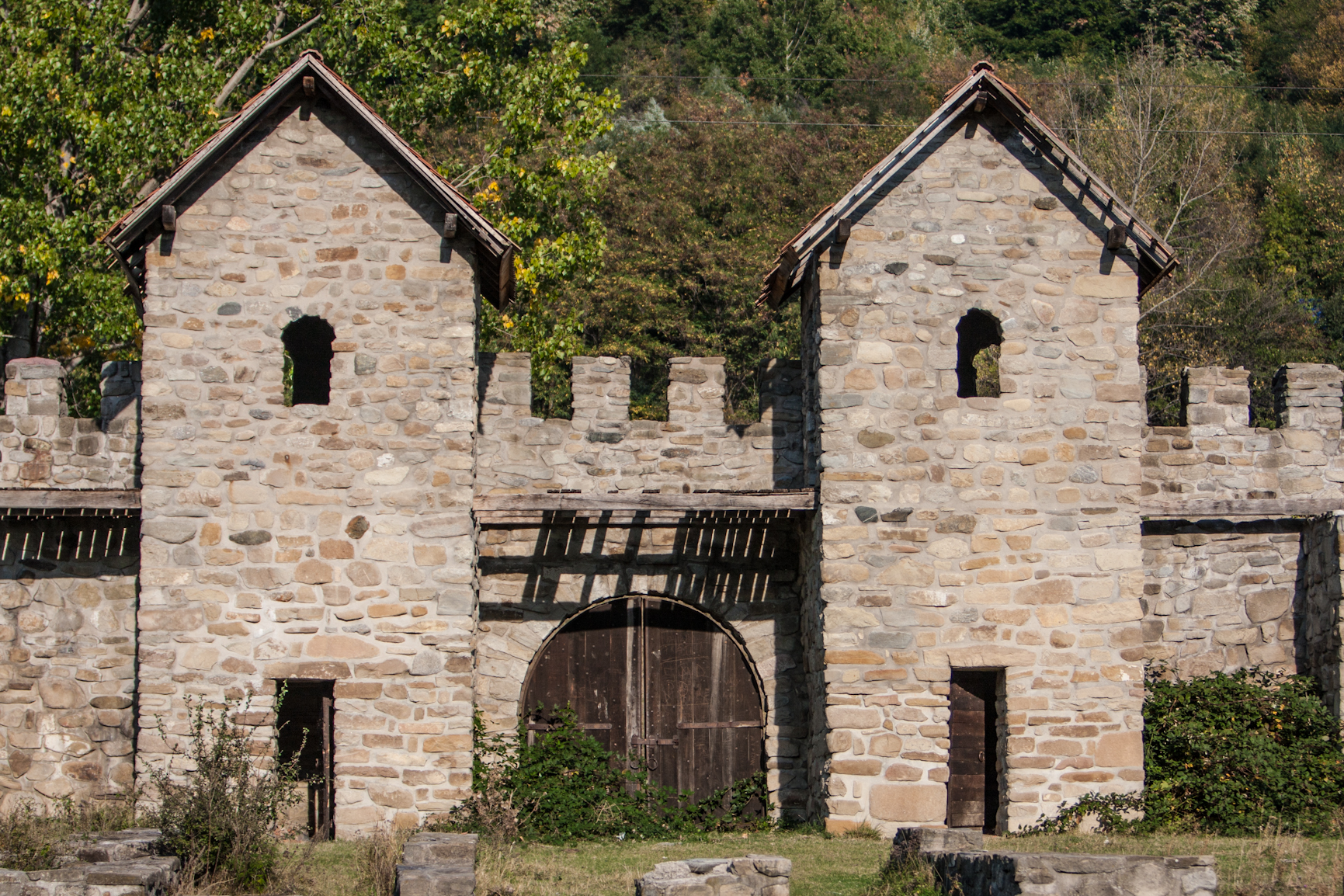
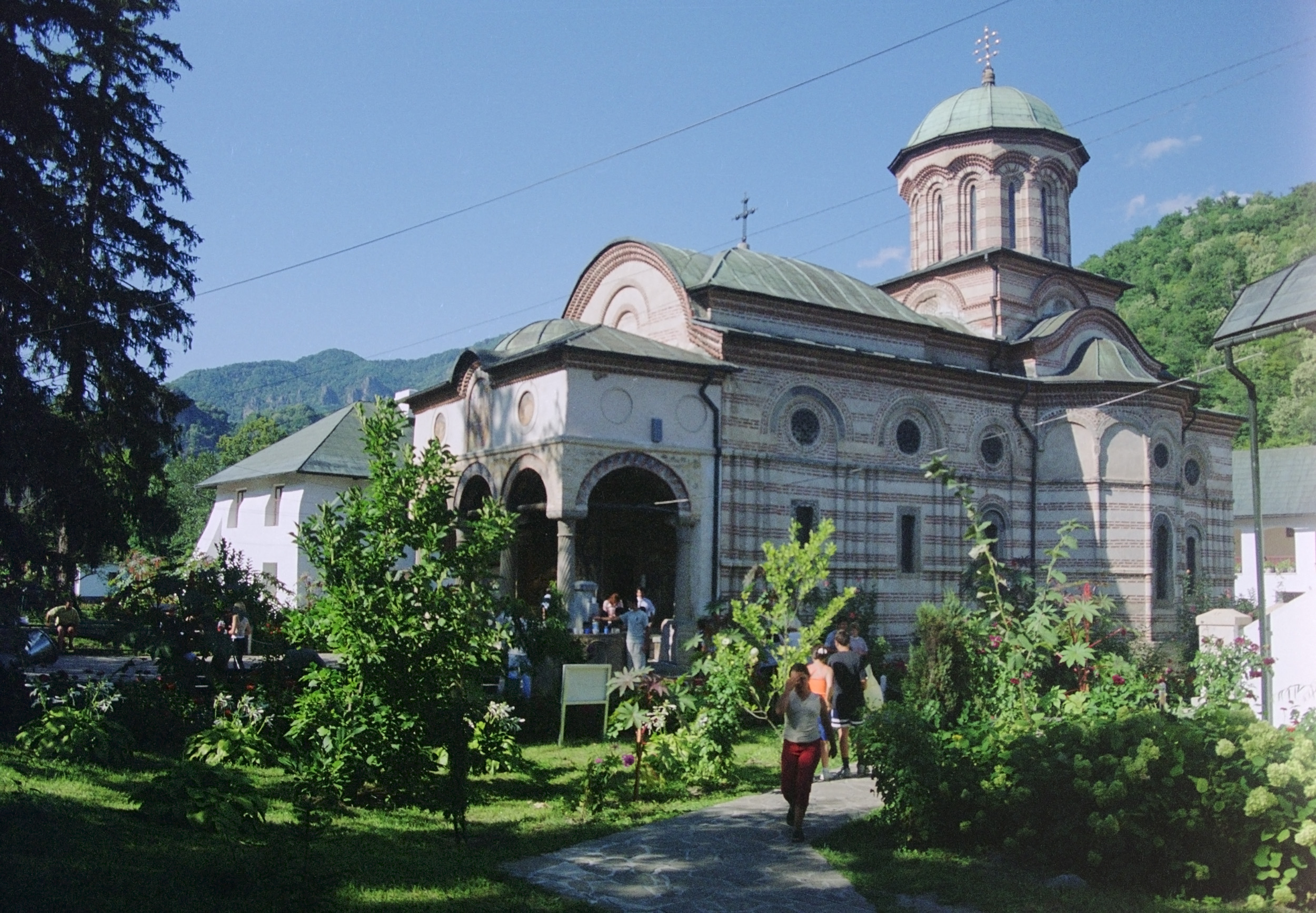
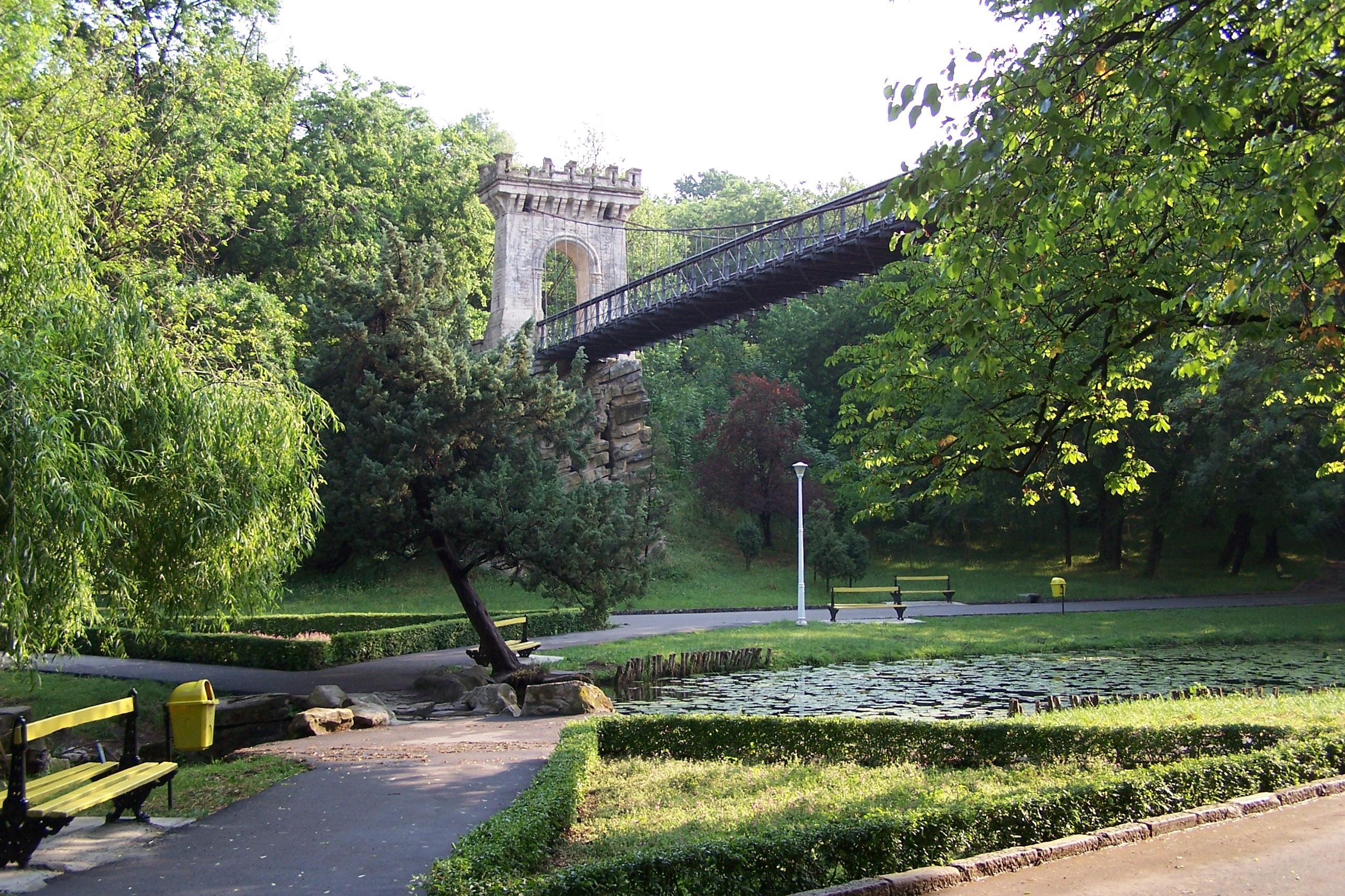
- Olt Defile Arutela Roman Fort Cozia Monastery Nicolae Romanescu Park

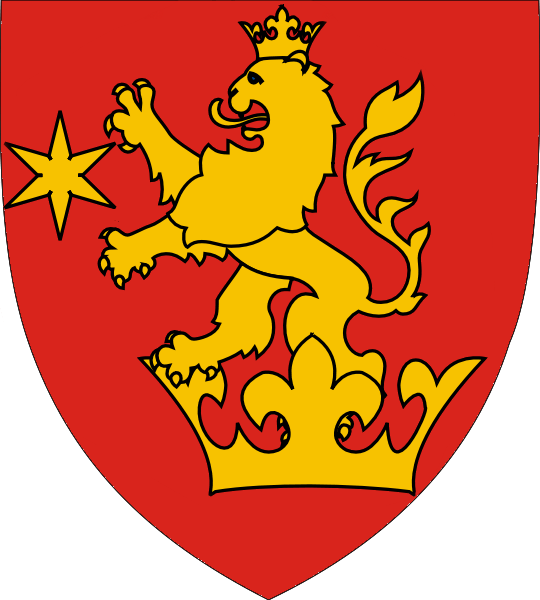
- Coat of arms

- Oltenia Muntenia, Banat, Western Moldavia, Bukovina, Transylvania, Dobruja and Crișana
- Country: Romania
- Largest city: Craiova

Area
  - Total: 24,095 km^{2} (9,303 sq mi)
- Demonym: Oltenian
- Time zone: UTC+2 (EET)
  - Summer (DST): UTC+3 (EEST)

Oltenia (Romanian pronunciation: [olˈtenia]), also called Lesser Wallachia – especially between 1718 and 1739 – is a historical province and geographical region of Romania in western Wallachia. It is situated between the Danube, the Southern Carpathians and the river Olt. The region's main city and traditional seat of power is Craiova.

== Names and etymology ==
The name Oltenia is derived from the river Olt which flows along the region's eastern border. In Latin, the name Vallachia Cisalutana ("Cis-Oltine Wallachia") was also used.

Under the Habsburgs (1718–1739), the region was officially the Banat of Craiova and commonly called Lesser Wallachia (German: Kleine Walachei; Serbo-Croatian: Мала Влашка / Mala Vlaška; Latin: Vallachia Minor) and sometimes Imperial Wallachia (German: Kaiserliche Walachei; Romanian: Chesariceasca Valahie; Latin: Caesarea Vallachia).

The official Romanian administrative region of Craiova that existed from 1952 to 1968 was also called Oltenia.

== History ==
=== Ancient times ===
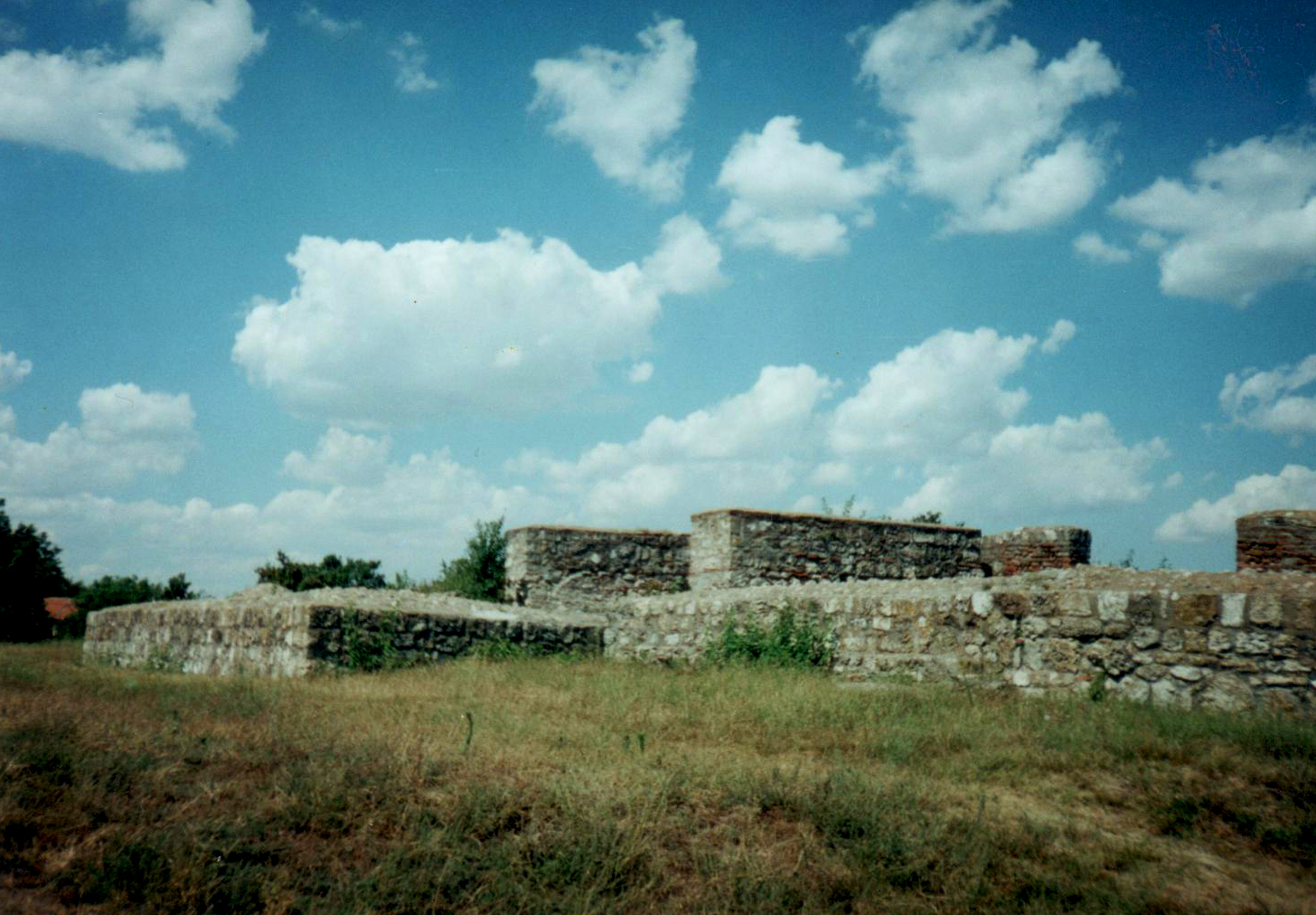
Sucidava - ancient Roman citadel at Corabia

Initially inhabited by Dacians, Oltenia was incorporated in the Roman Empire (106, at the end of the Dacian Wars; see Roman Dacia). In 129, during Hadrian's rule, it formed Dacia Inferior, one of the two divisions of the province (together with Dacia Superior, in today's Transylvania); Marcus Aurelius' administrative reform made Oltenia one of the three new divisions (tres Daciae) as Dacia Malvensis, its capital and chief city being named Romula. It was colonized with veterans of the Roman legions. The Romans withdrew their administration south of the Danube at the end of the 3rd century and Oltenia was ruled by the foederati Germanic Goths. In the late 4th century Oltenia came under the rule of the Taifals before invasion by the Huns.

=== Middle Ages ===
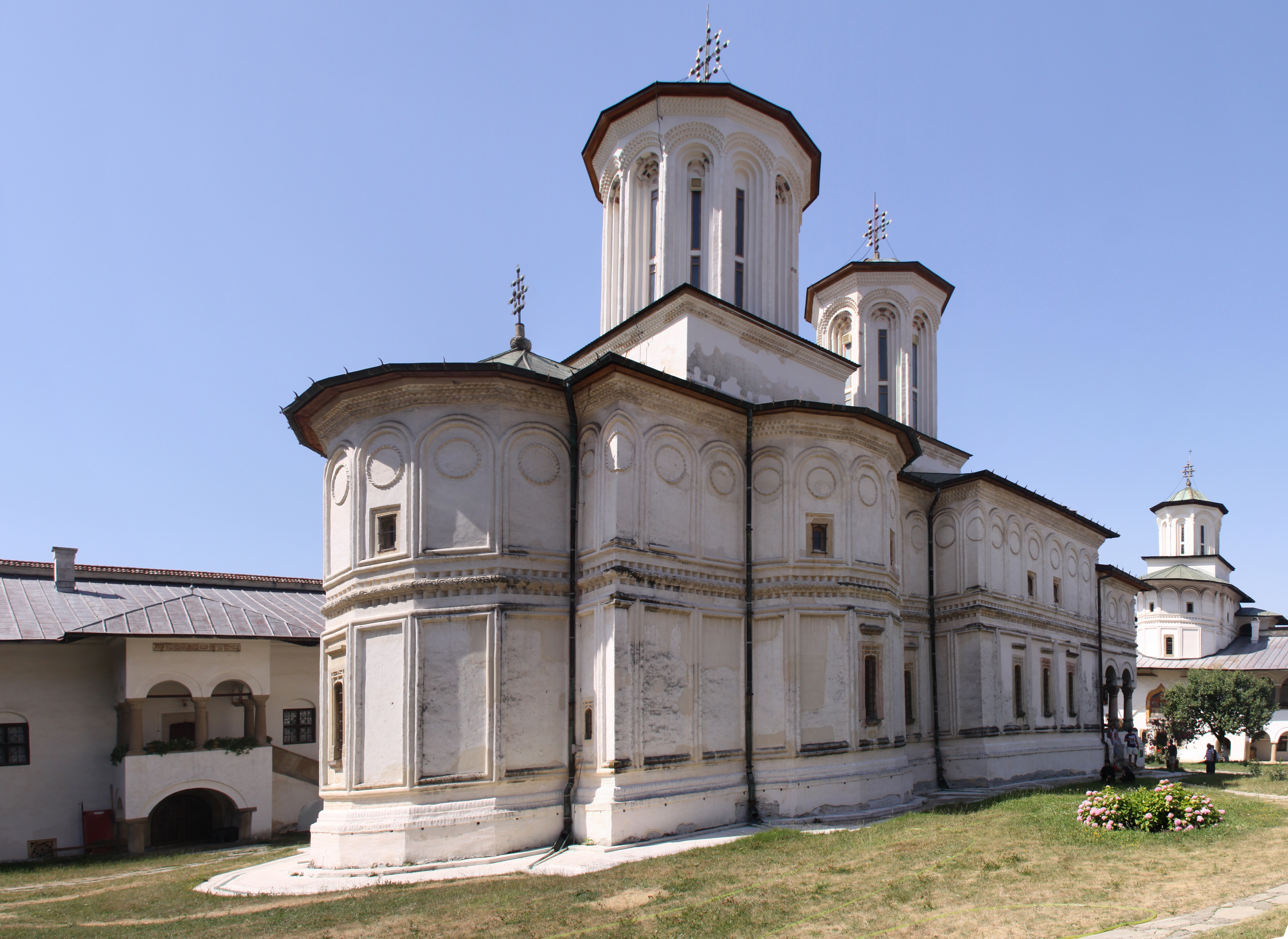
Horezu Monastery - UNESCO World Heritage

From 681, with some interruptions, it was part of the Bulgarian Empire (see Bulgarian lands across the Danube).

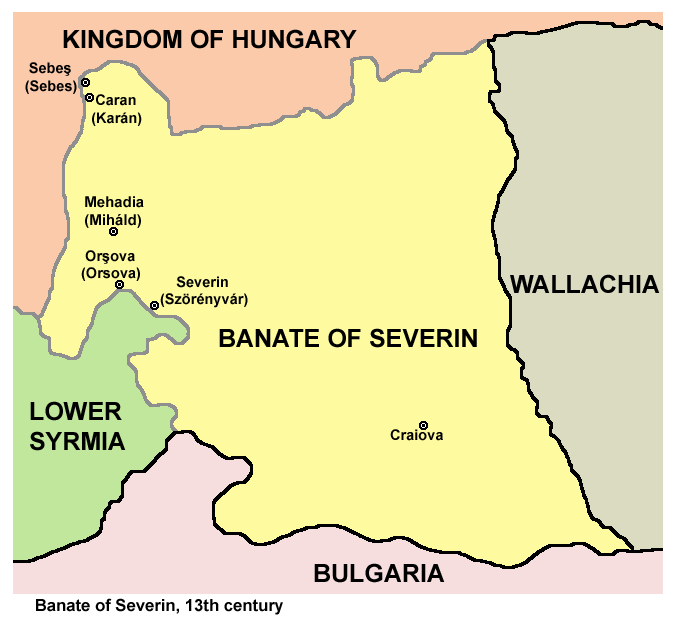
Banate of Severin

In 1233, the Kingdom of Hungary formed the Banate of Severin in the western part of the region that would persist until the 1526 Battle of Mohács.

Around 1247, a polity emerged in Oltenia under the rule of Litovoi. The rise of the medieval state of Wallachia followed in the 14th century, and the voivode (Prince of Wallachia) was represented in Oltenia by a ban - "the Great Ban of Craiova" (with seat in Craiova after it was moved from Strehaia). This came to be considered the greatest office in Wallachian hierarchy, and one that was held most by members of the Craiovești family, from the late 15th century to about 1550. The title would continue to exist up until 1831.

During the 15th century, Wallachia had to accept the Ottoman suzerainty and to pay an annual tribute to keep its autonomy as a vassal. From the Craiovești family, many bans cooperated with the Turks. However, many rulers, including the Oltenian-born Michael the Brave, fought against the Ottomans, giving Wallachia brief periods of independence.

=== Modern times ===
After 1716, the Ottomans decided to cease choosing the voivodes from among the Wallachian boyars, and to appoint foreign governors. As the governors were Orthodox Greeks living in Phanar, Constantinople, this period is known as the Phanariote regime.

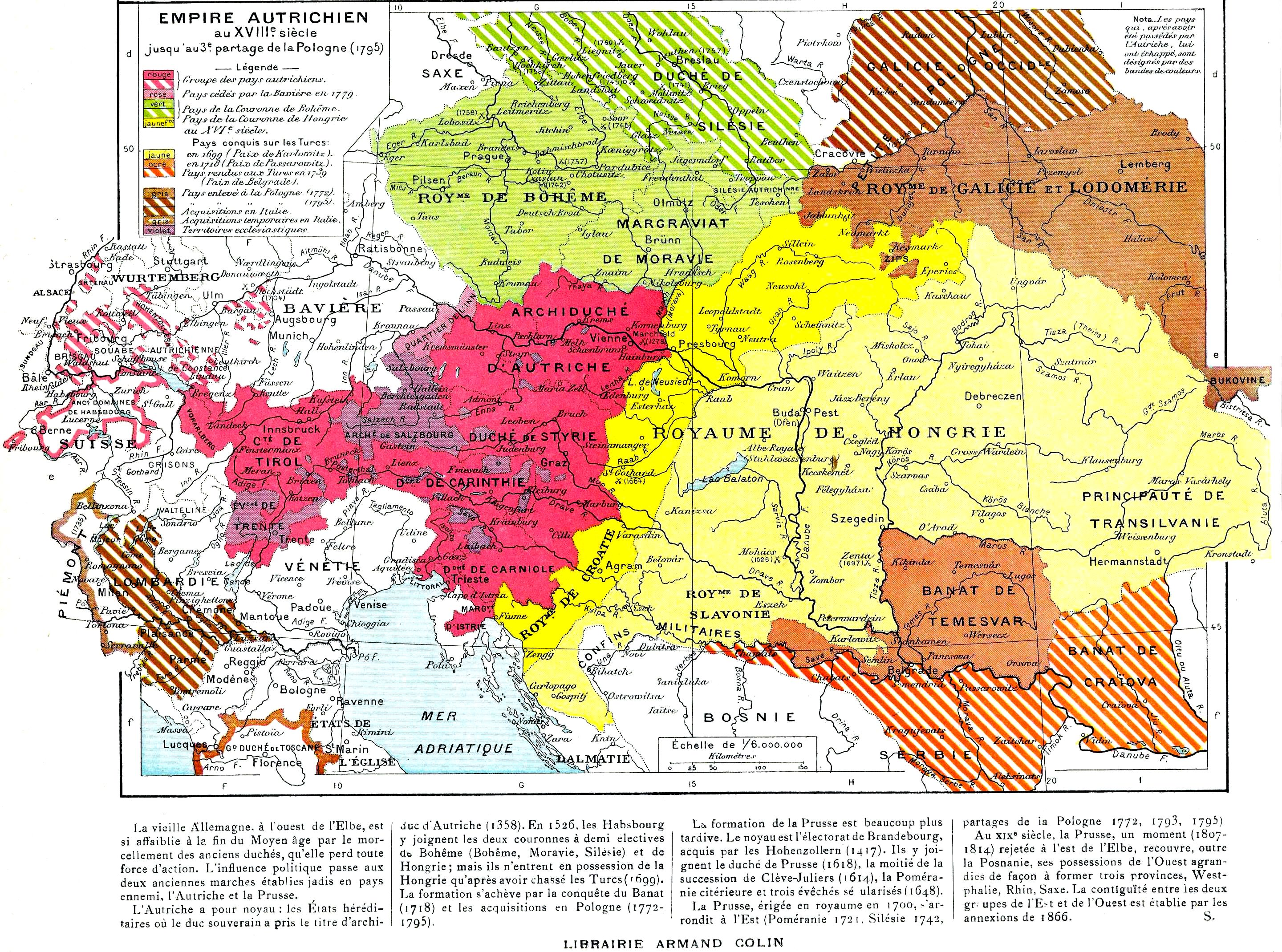
Oltenia under the Austrian Empire as the Banat of Craiova in the 18th century

Two years later, in 1718 under the terms of the Treaty of Passarowitz, Oltenia was split from Wallachia and annexed by the Habsburg monarchy as the Banat of Craiova (de facto, it was under Austrian occupation by 1716); in 1737, it was returned to Wallachia under Prince Constantine Mavrocordatos (see Austro-Turkish War of 1716–1718 and Austro-Russian–Turkish War (1735–1739)). Under the occupation, Oltenia was the only part of the Danubian Principalities (with the later exception of Bukovina) to experience Enlightened absolutism and Austrian administration, although these were met by considerable and mounting opposition from conservative boyars. While welcomed at first as liberators, the Austrians quickly disenchanted the inhabitants by imposing rigid administrative, fiscal, judicial and political reforms which were meant to centralize and integrate the territory (antagonizing both ends of the social spectrum: withdrawing privileges from the nobility and enforcing taxes for peasants).

In 1761, the residence of Bans was moved to Bucharest, in a move towards centralism (a kaymakam represented the boyars in Craiova). It remained there until the death of the last Ban, Barbu Văcărescu, in 1832.

In 1821, Oltenia and Gorj County were at the center of Tudor Vladimirescu's uprising (see Wallachian uprising of 1821). Vladimirescu initially gathered his Pandurs in Padeș and relied on a grid of fortified monasteries such as Tismana and Strehaia.

== Symbols ==
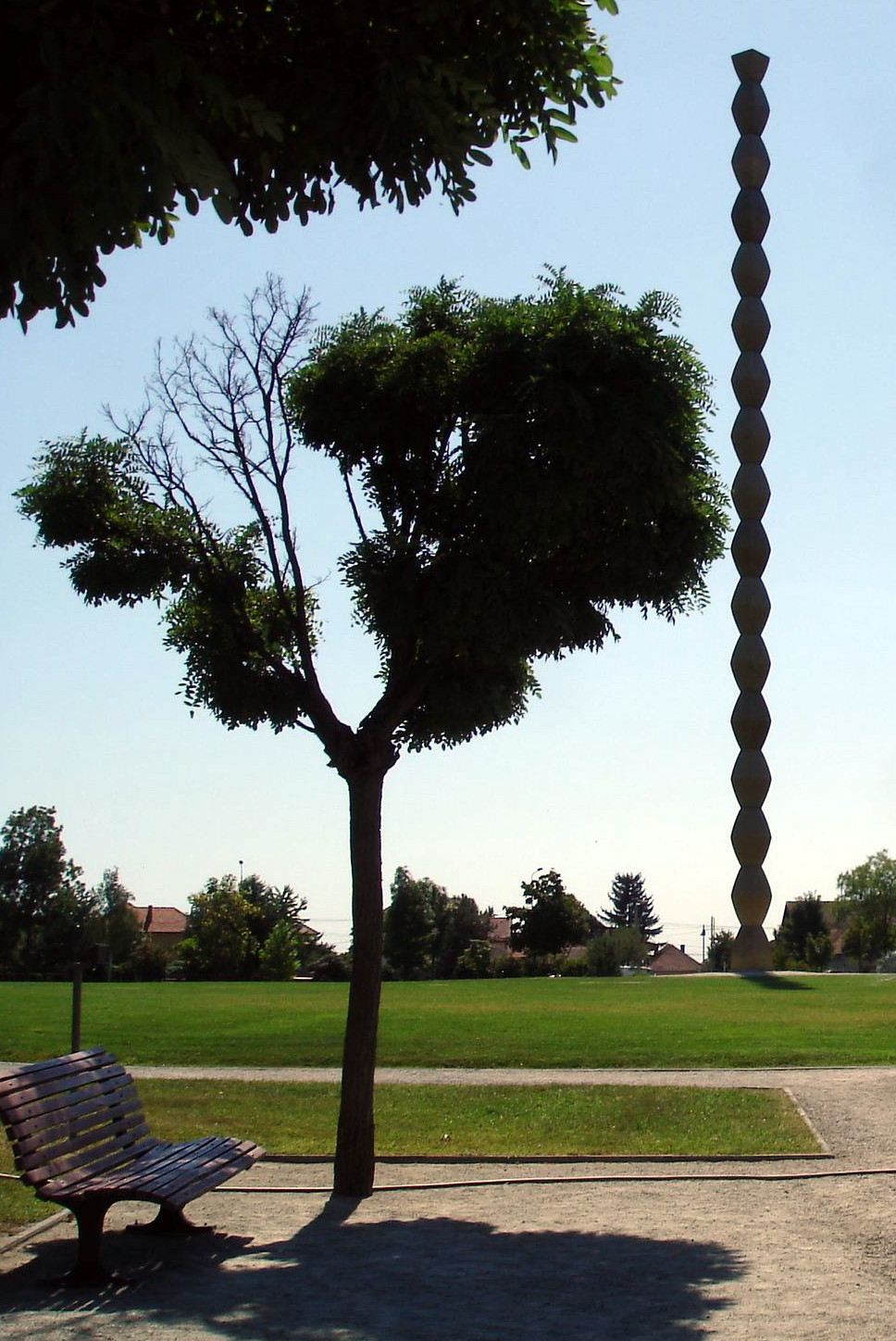
Brancusi - The Endless Column in Târgu Jiu

The traditional heraldic symbol of Oltenia, also understood to represent Banat, is part of the coat of arms of Romania (lower dexter): on gules field, an or lion rampant, facing dexter, holding a sword, and standing over an or bridge (Apollodorus of Damascus Bridge at Drobeta Turnu Severin) and stylised waves.

Since its promulgation on 13 April 2017, Oltenia Day is officially celebrated on 21 March.

== Geography ==
The counties which comprise Oltenia

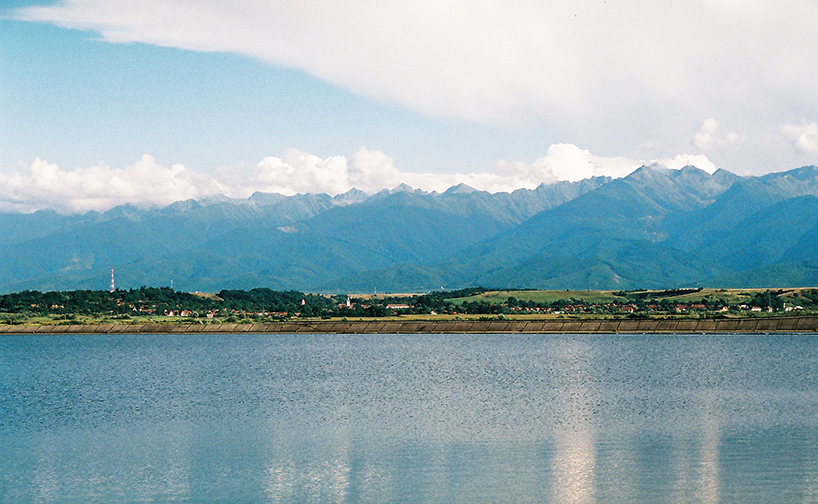
The Olt River separates Oltenia from Muntenia

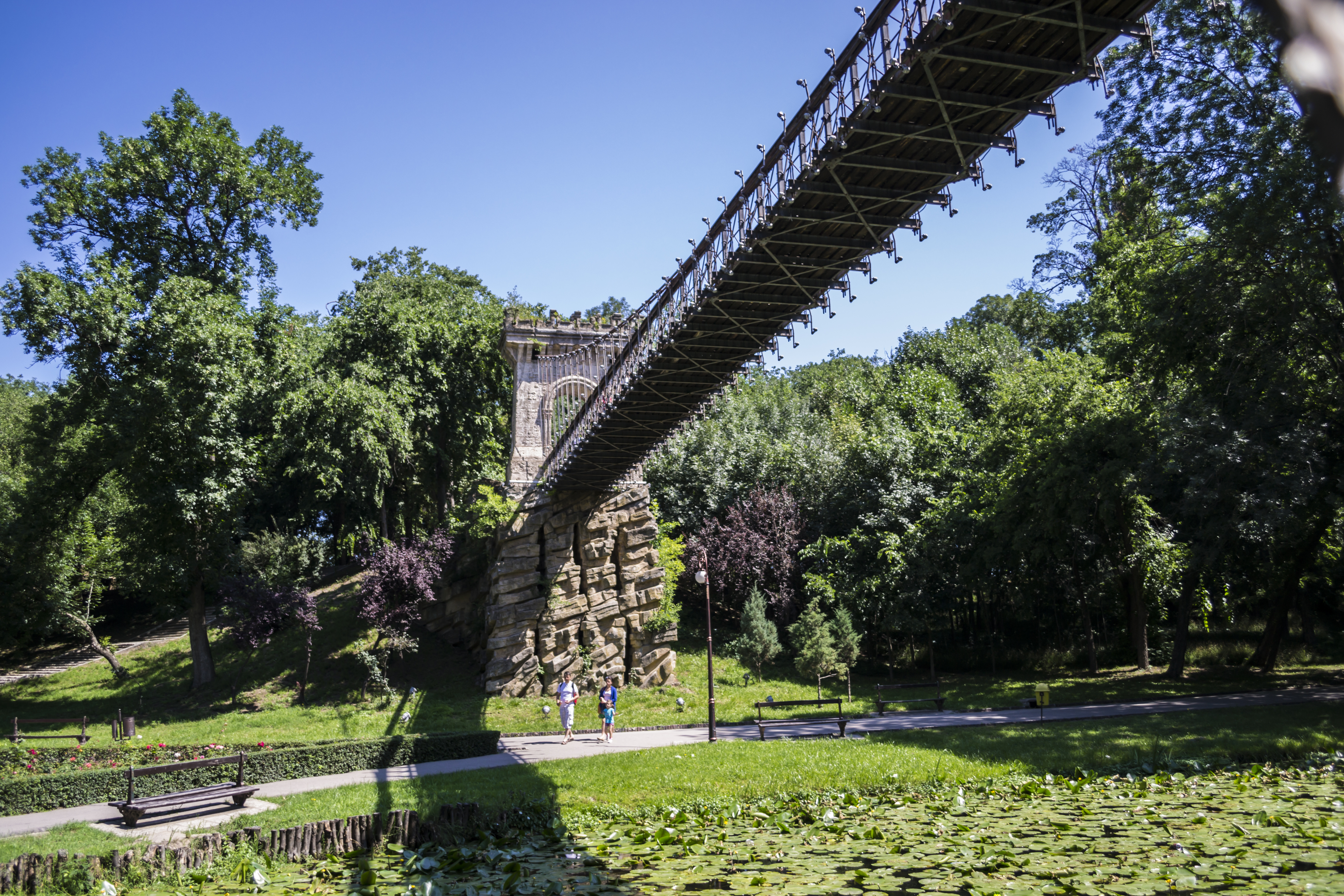
Suspension bridge in Craiova's Nicolae Romanescu Park

Oltenia is part of the Sud - Vest development region. It entirely includes the counties of Gorj and Dolj and parts of the counties of Mehedinți (mainly in Oltenia, but the western part belongs to Banat), Vâlcea (part east of the Olt river is in Muntenia, a small part in the north-west lies in Transylvania), Olt (the western half, the former Romanați county) and Teleorman (only the commune Islaz).

Oltenia's main city and seat for a majority of the late Middle Ages is Craiova. The first medieval seat of Oltenia was Turnu Severin, anciently called Drobeta, in the Banate of Severin. That city is located near the site of Trajan's Bridge, built by Apollodorus of Damascus for Emperor Trajan in his conquest of the region.

=== Towns ===
City	County	Population
Craiova	Dolj	234,140
Râmnicu Vâlcea	Vâlcea	93,151
Drobeta-Turnu Severin	Mehedinți	79,865
Târgu Jiu	Gorj	73,545
Slatina	Olt	63,487
Caracal	Olt	27,403
Balș	Olt	16,114
Motru	Gorj	15,950
Băilești	Dolj	15,928
Drăgășani	Vâlcea	15,617
Filiași	Dolj	15,031
Calafat	Dolj	13,807
Corabia	Olt	13,527
Dăbuleni	Dolj	10,333
Rovinari	Gorj	10,246
Strehaia	Mehedinți	9,059
Bumbești-Jiu	Gorj	7,684
Târgu Cărbunești	Gorj	7,616
Băbeni	Vâlcea	7,570
Segarcea	Dolj	7,356
Călimănești	Vâlcea	7,348
Turceni	Gorj	6,891
Horezu	Vâlcea	6,467
Tismana	Gorj	6,359
Piatra Olt	Olt	6,000
Brezoi	Vâlcea	5,696
Novaci	Gorj	5,276
Vânju Mare	Mehedinți	5,078
Baia de Aramă	Mehedinți	4,478
Bechet	Dolj	4,355
Bălcești	Vâlcea	4,235
Berbești	Vâlcea	4,231
Țicleni	Gorj	3,934
Băile Olăneşti	Vâlcea	3,750
Ocnele Mari	Vâlcea	3,134
Băile Govora	Vâlcea	2,158

== Sources ==
- Vlad Georgescu, Istoria ideilor politice românești (1369–1878), Munich, 1987
- Neagu Djuvara, Între Orient și Occident. Țările române la începutul epocii moderne, Humanitas, Bucharest, 1995
- Constantin C. Giurescu, Istoria Bucureștilor. Din cele mai vechi timpuri pînă în zilele noastre, Ed. Pentru Literatură, Bucharest, 1966, p. 93
- Șerban Papacostea, Oltenia sub stăpânirea austriacă (1718–1739), Bucharest, 1971, p. 59
- Ingrao, Charles; Samardžić, Nikola; Pešalj, Jovan, eds. (2011). The Peace of Passarowitz, 1718. West Lafayette: Purdue University Press. ISBN 9781557535948.
