= Great Banship of Craiova =

The Great Banate of Craiova (Romanian: Marea Bănie a Craiovei) or Banship of Craiova was in the Middle Ages one of the most important political institutions of Wallachia. It was established during the last decades of the 15th century, after the movement of the seat from Strehaia (1491). The first known record of Craiova itself was a charter by Laiota Basarab in 1475.

The Great Ban of Craiova was the Viceroy of Lesser Wallachia and he was, as hierarchic order, the greatest Wallachian high official. His authority was extended to the area of Oltenia. Having the consent of the Wallachian ruler, the ban of Craiova could confiscate the fortune of one who made himself guilty of "betrayal". The ban of Craiova could punish by death the guilty persons.

Since 1512, when the reign of Neagoe Basarab began, the Ban got similar powers to the hospodar in the territory on the right of Olt river. The title was held most by members of the Craiovești family (from 1492 to 1532).

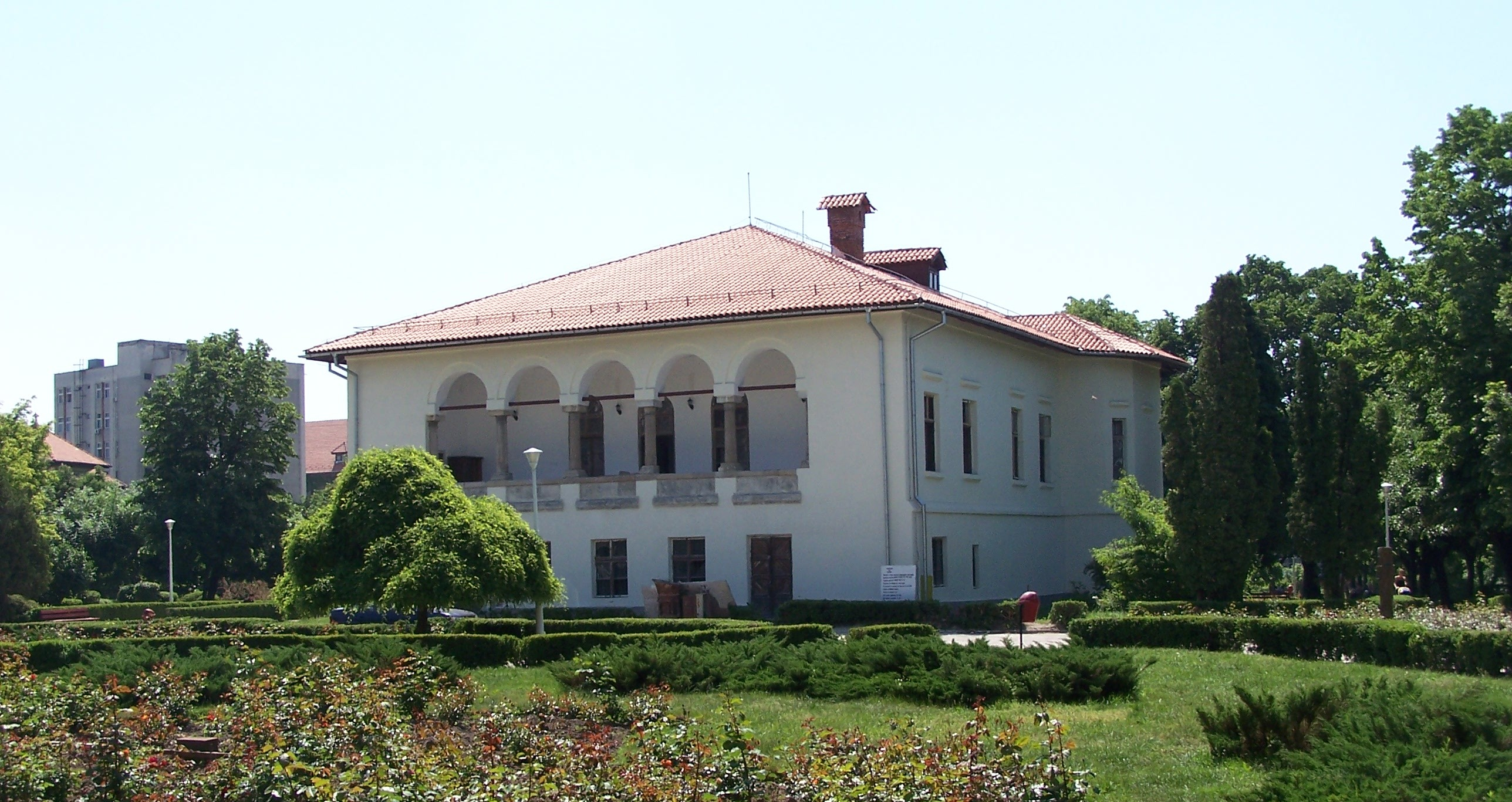
The last headquarters of the Banate

In the second half of 16th century, the institution met a moment of crisis, mainly due to aggressive attempts of the Turks to establish dominance over Wallachia. Oltenia had a high level of administrative, judicial and military independence, without any relation to central leadership of the country, except to pay tribute to the Wallachian ruler, who, in turn, sent it on to the Ottomans. The role of the institution increased during the rule of Michael the Brave. In 1761 the permanent residence of the ban was moved to Bucharest. Up until 1831, the Ban was the deputy of the voivode (Prince of Wallachia) in Oltenia.

The headquarters of the Banate (Băniei House) is the oldest non-religious building that exists in Craiova, dating from 1699. Today it hosts the Museum of Ethnography and Folk Art.

== See also ==
- Banat of Craiova
- Banate of Severin
