= St. Nicholas Church, Făgăraș =

Orthodox church in Făgăraș, Romania

Coordinates: 45°50′24″N 24°58′42″E

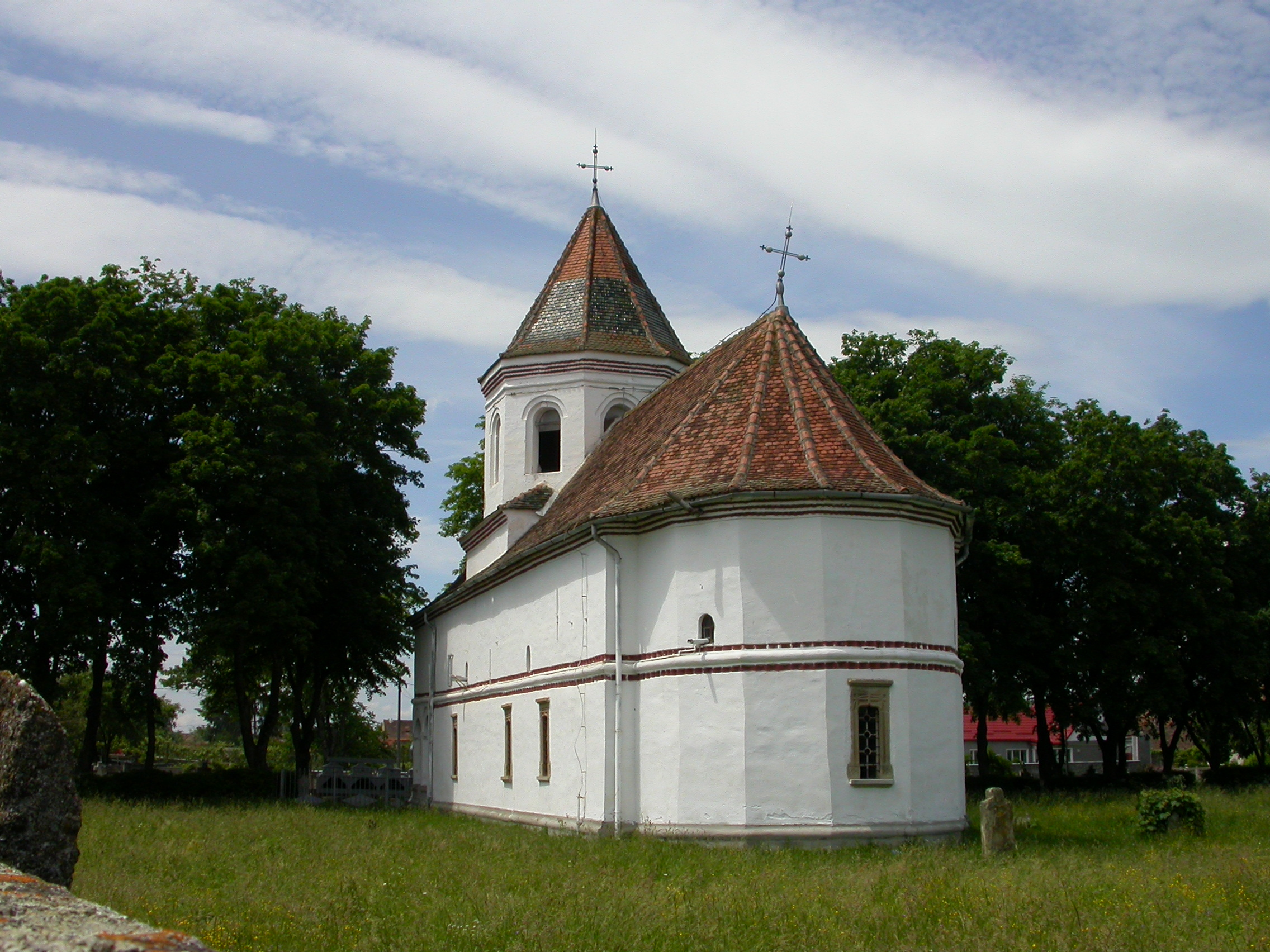
St. Nicholas Church

St. Nicholas Church (Romanian: Biserica Sfântul Nicolae) is a Romanian Orthodox church located at 16 Tudor Vladimirescu Street, Făgăraș, Romania. It is dedicated to Saint Nicholas.

== History ==
The city’s oldest church, it replaced an earlier one that burned. For some four decades, the local Orthodox used churches in neighboring villages, as the Protestant and Catholic authorities of the Principality of Transylvania refused to approve a new one. Finally, the community appealed to Constantin Brâncoveanu, Prince of Wallachia, known for his piety. The latter wrote on their behalf to Michael I Apafi, Prince of Transylvania. Michael agreed on certain conditions: the walls were to be neither too thick nor too high, and were not to obstruct the view of the Făgăraș Citadel. Moreover, the Reformed Church was to continue its supervision of Orthodox priests in the city.

Above the door, a Romanian Cyrillic inscription features the Wallachian coat of arms, mentions that Brâncoveanu was the ktetor and a construction date of 1698. In 1723, the church was confiscated and handed over to the Romanian Greek Catholic Church, again forcing the local Orthodox to seek other places of worship. For the next fourteen years, it served two bishops as their cathedral: Ioan Giurgiu Patachi and Inocențiu Micu-Klein. In 1737, the latter moved the church headquarters to Blaj, and St. Nicholas became a parish church. In 1948, when the new Communist regime outlawed the Greek Catholic Church, the building was transferred to Orthodox control. Repairs took place in 1994–1998, bringing to light the paintings that had been blackened over time.

== Description ==
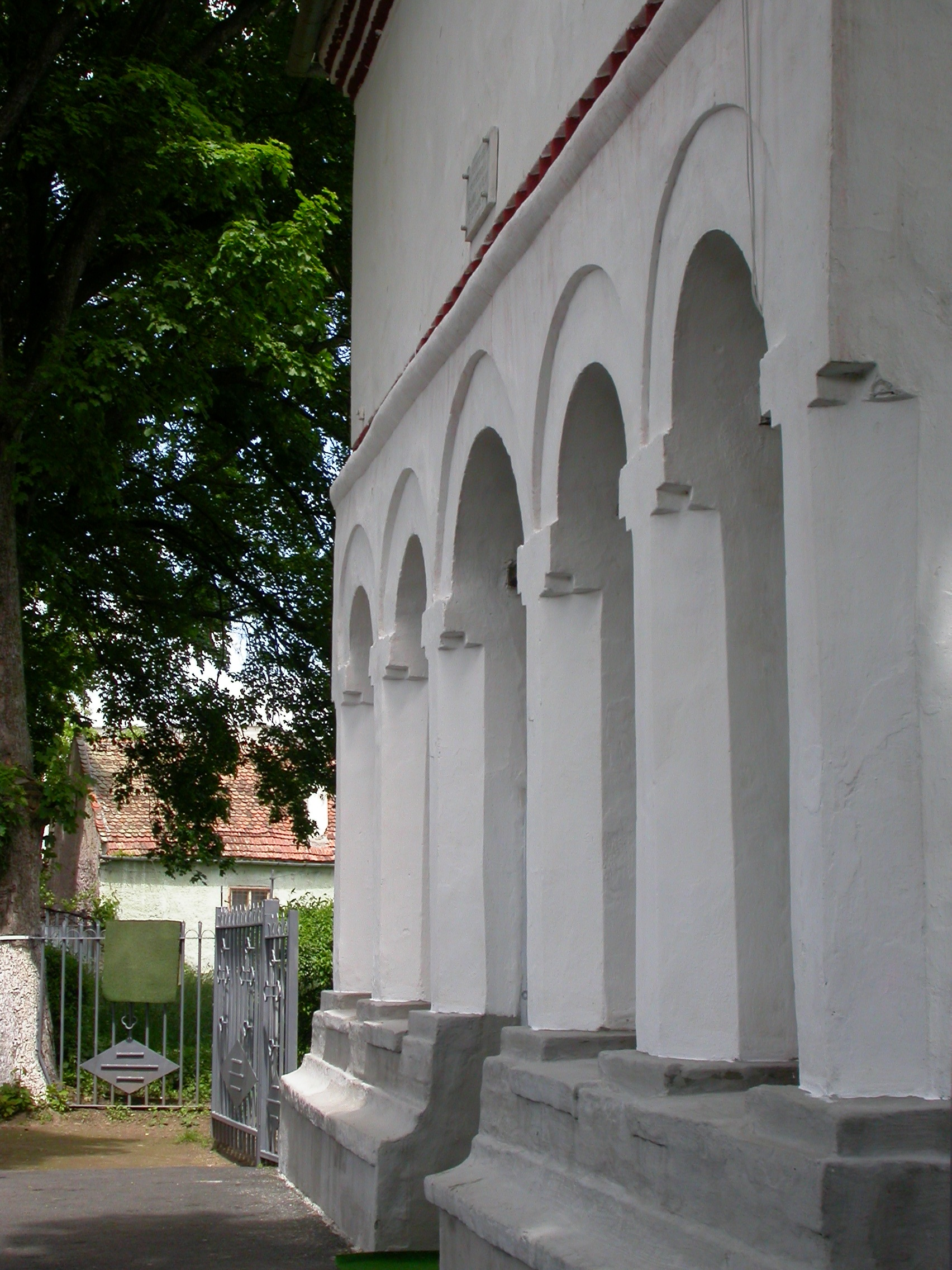
Porch with octagonal columns

The unknown architect was likely trained at Horezu Monastery. The church features the Brâncovenesc style. Its characteristic decoration appears in two rows on the facade, as well as in two cornices beneath the roof; these are done in unpainted brick. The open porch is surrounded by ten octagonal columns. The bell tower, above the nave, is also octagonal. There are three spires, made of brick and semi-spherical. Also typical of the Brâncovenesc style are the seven windows with frames of carved stone, and the door frame, which preserves the original form.

The iconostasis is original, carved out of oak in the same Brâncovenesc manner, then gilt. Inscriptions indicate that the painter came from Câmpulung. The iconostasis is the largest surviving Brâncovenesc example, considerably larger than at Horezu or the Târgoviște Princely Church. The altar and nave are painted in fresco, closely adhering to the rules of Byzantine iconography. The vestibule was painted much later by an unknown artist, and is considerably less valuable.

The church is listed as a historic monument by Romania's Ministry of Culture and Religious Affairs.
