= Kretzulescu Palace =

- Alternative names: Crețulescu

General information
- Architectural style: second Empire style, Romanesque revival, Gothic Revival, Eclecticism
- Location: Bucharest, Romania, Știrbei Vodă Street nr. 39, Sector 1
- Coordinates: 44°26′22.41″N 26°5′18.92″E
- Construction started: 1902
- Completed: 1904

Kretzulescu Palace (sometimes spelled Crețulescu) is a historic building near the Cișmigiu Gardens on Știrbei Vodă Street nr. 39, in Bucharest, Romania. It was built for the noble (Princely) Kretzulescu family in 1902–1904 by Romanian architect Petre Antonescu (1873–1965).

The palace was built for Elena Kretzulescu (1857–1930), the daughter of Constantin Kretzulescu (1798–1863) and Maria Filipescu (1835–1878). While she was away in Paris, Barbu Bellu lived for many years in this house.

From 1972 to 2011, the Kretzulescu Palace housed the headquarters of UNESCO's European Centre for Higher Education UNESCO-CEPES (known as CEPES after its French name, Centre Europeén pour l'enseignement supérieur).

== See also ==
- Kretzulescu Church
