= Kretzulescu Church =

Orthodox church in Bucharest, Romania

- Biserica Kretzulescu
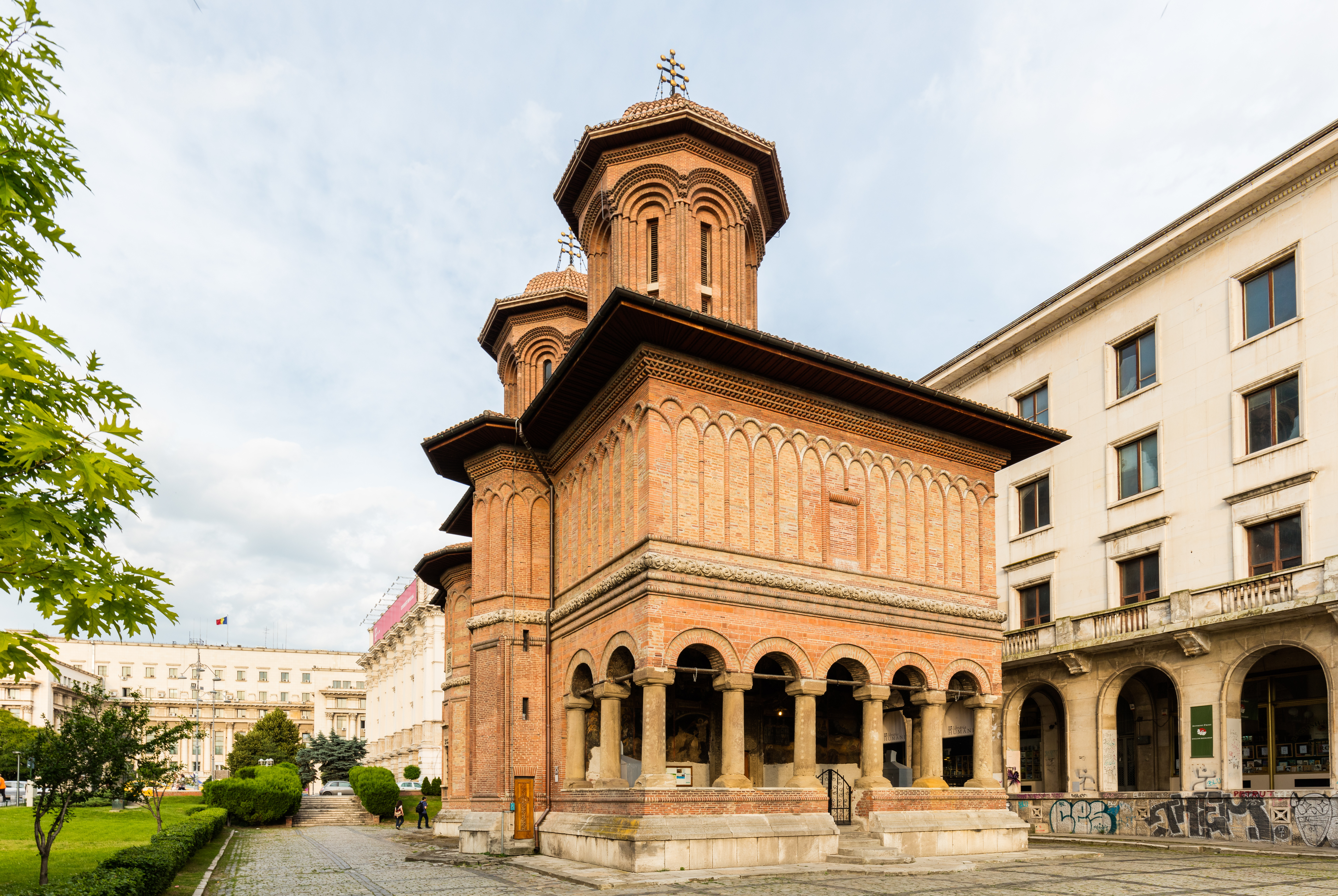
- Kretzulescu Church
- 44°26′17.11″N 26°5′47.90″E
- Location: 45A Calea Victoriei, Sector 1, Bucharest
- Country: Romania
- Denomination: Eastern Orthodox

Architecture
- Functional status: active
- Style: Brâncovenesc style
- Completed: 1722

Kretzulescu Church (Romanian: Biserica Kretzulescu or Crețulescu) is an Eastern Orthodox church in central Bucharest, Romania. Built in the Brâncovenesc style, it is located on Calea Victoriei, nr. 45A, at one of the corners of Revolution Square, next to the former Royal Palace.

The church was commissioned in 1720–1722 by the boyar Iordache Crețulescu (head of the prominent noble, later Princely, Kretzulescu family) and his wife Safta, a daughter of prince Constantin Brâncoveanu. Originally, the exterior was painted, but since the restoration work done in 1935–1936 (under the supervision of architect Ștefan Balș), the façade is made of brick. The frescoes on the porch date from the original structure, while the interior frescoes were painted by Gheorghe Tattarescu in 1859–1860.

The church, damaged during the 1940 Vrancea earthquake, was repaired in 1942–1943. In the early days of the communist regime, Kretzulescu Church was slated for demolition, but was saved due to efforts of architects such as Henriette Delavrancea-Gibory. More renovations took place after the Bucharest earthquake of 1977 and the Revolution of 1989. To the side of the church now stands a memorial bust of Corneliu Coposu.

== See also ==
- Crețulescu Palace

== Gallery ==
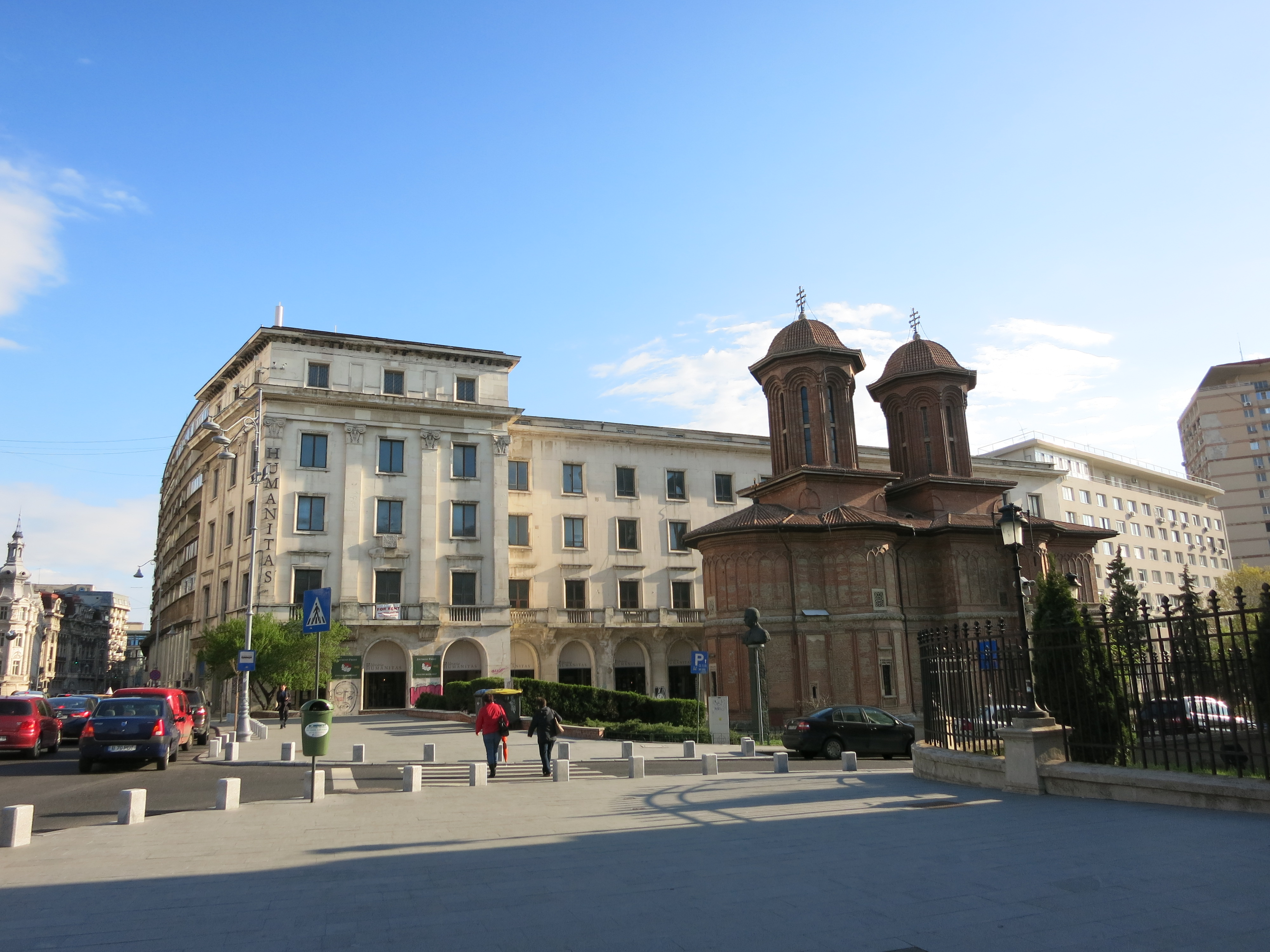

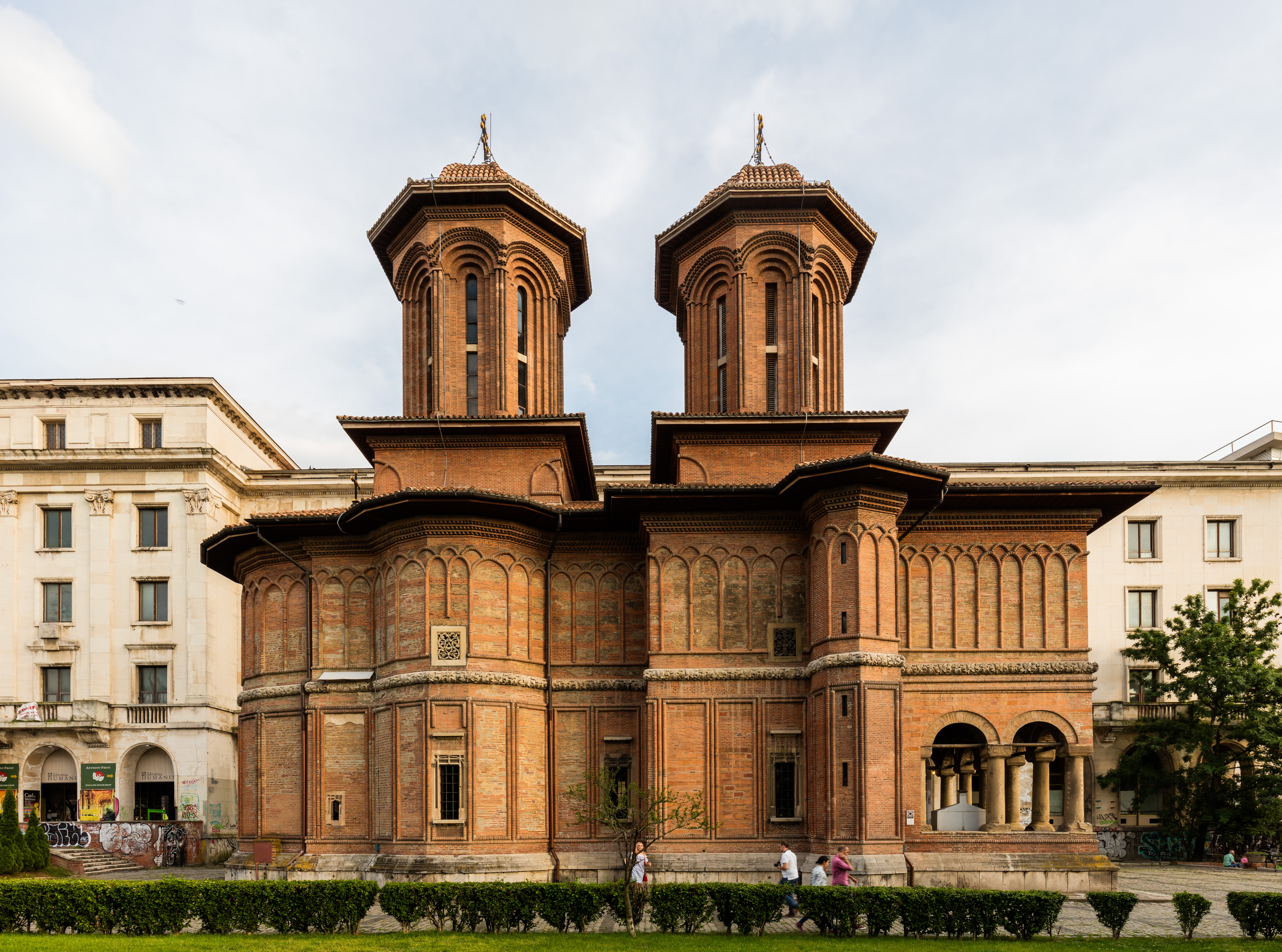

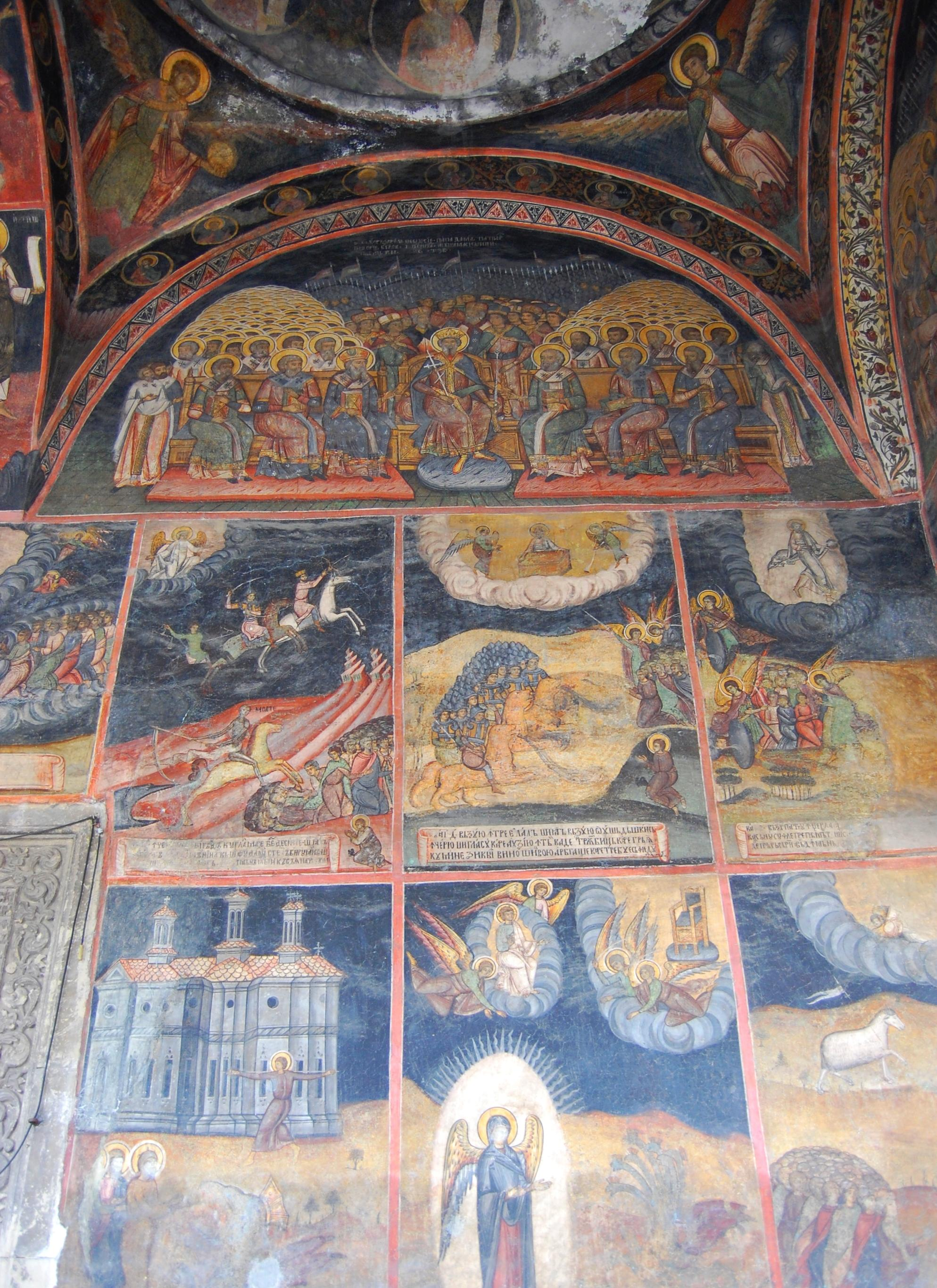

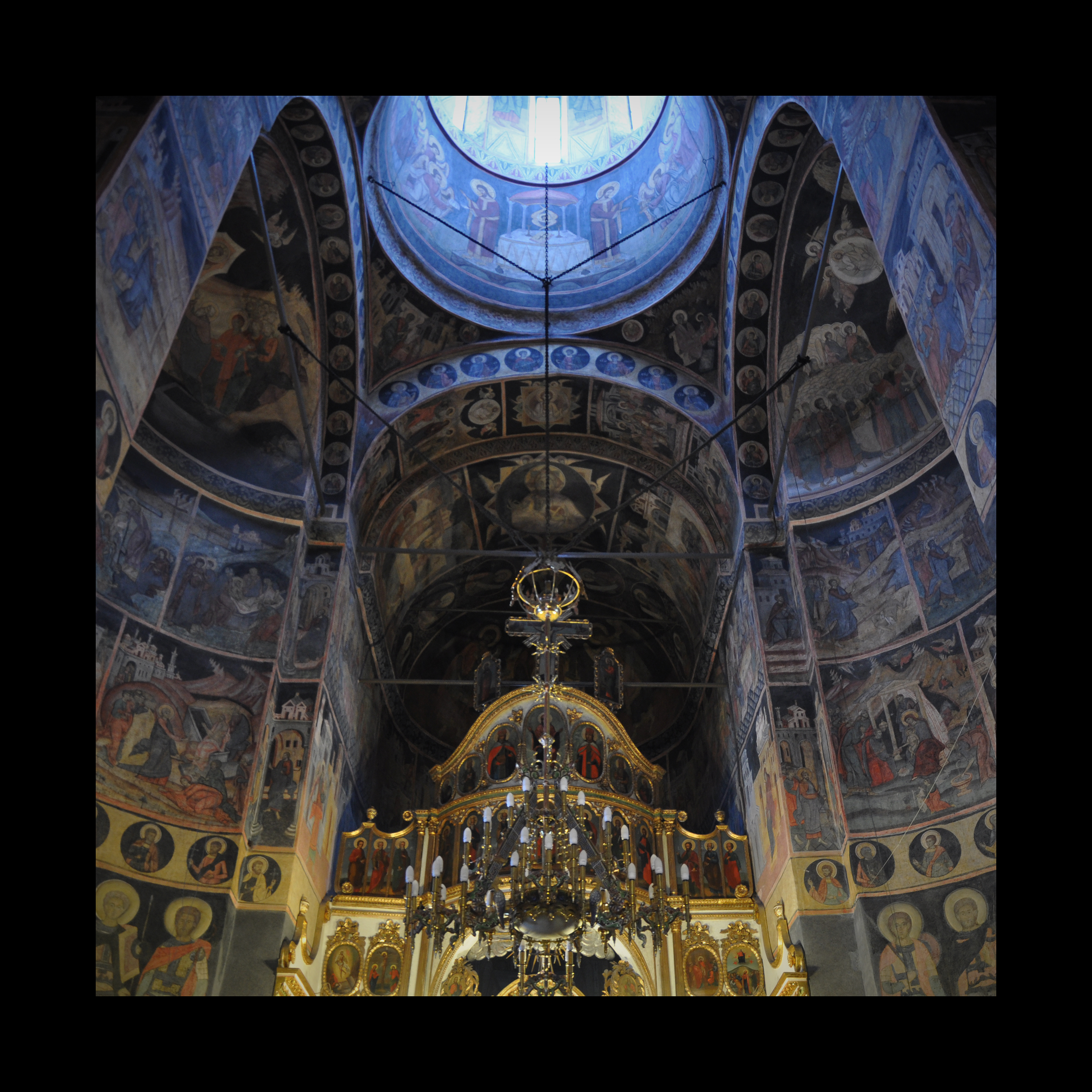

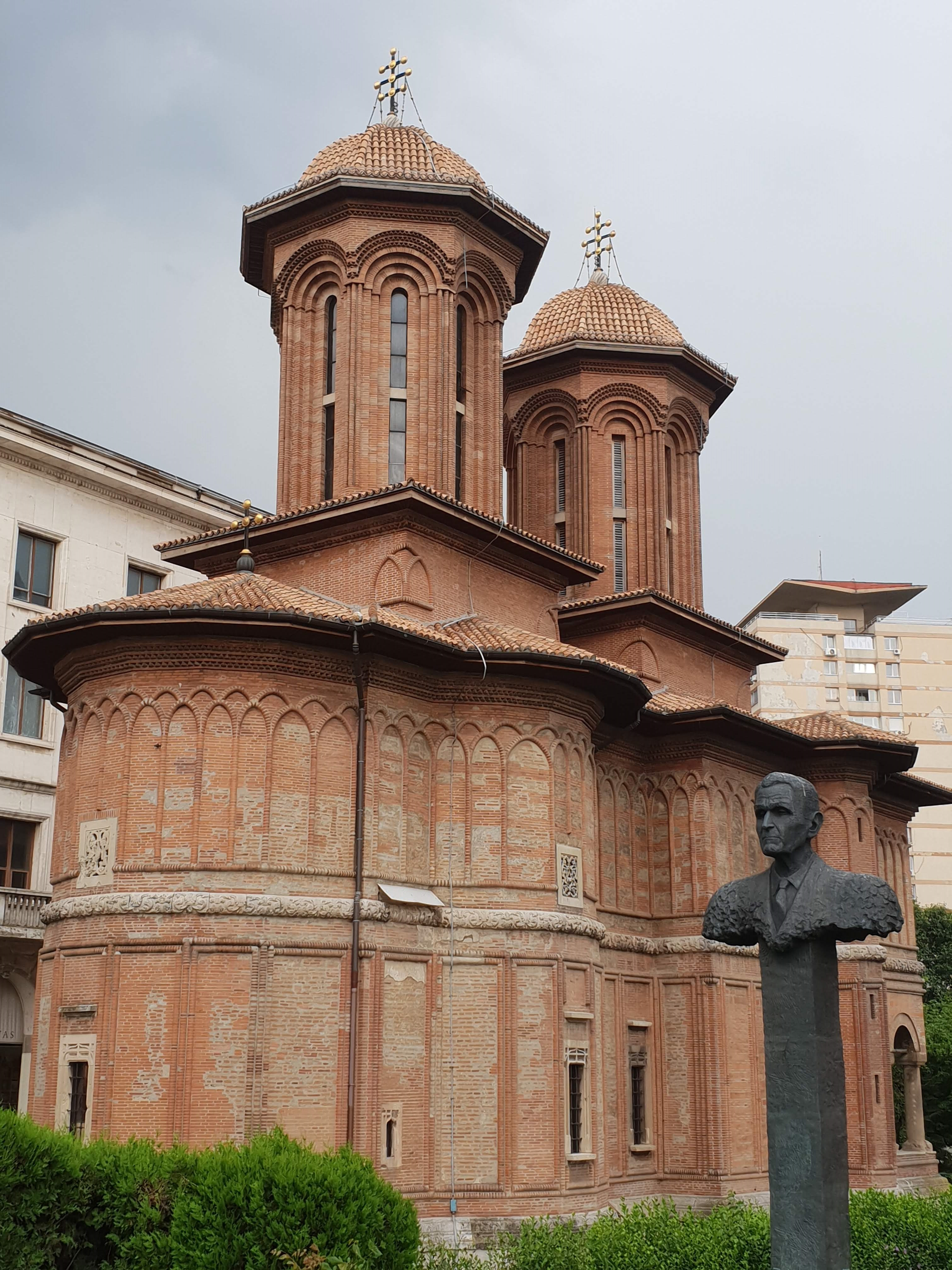
