= Brâncovenesc art =

Romanian early modern artistic style

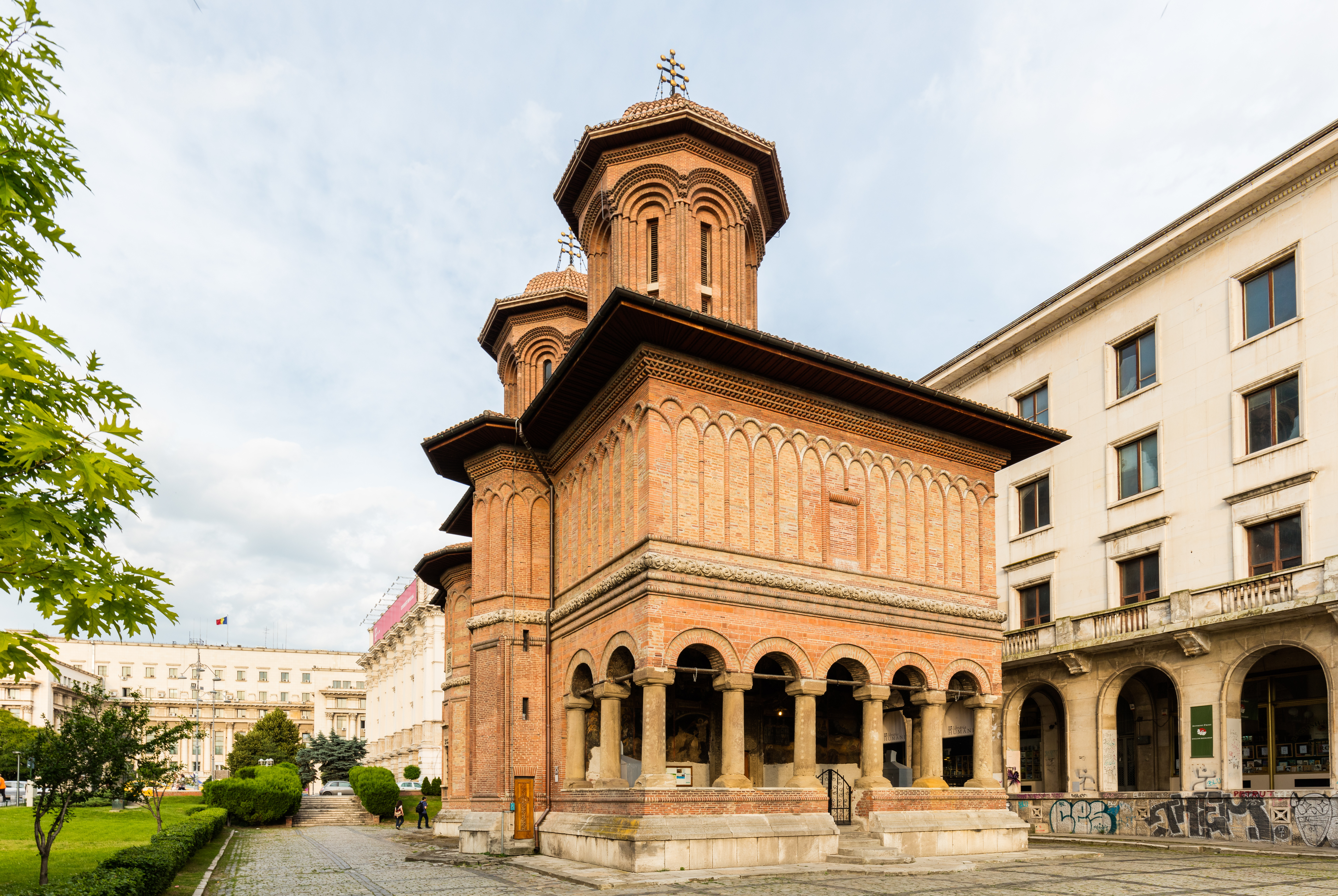
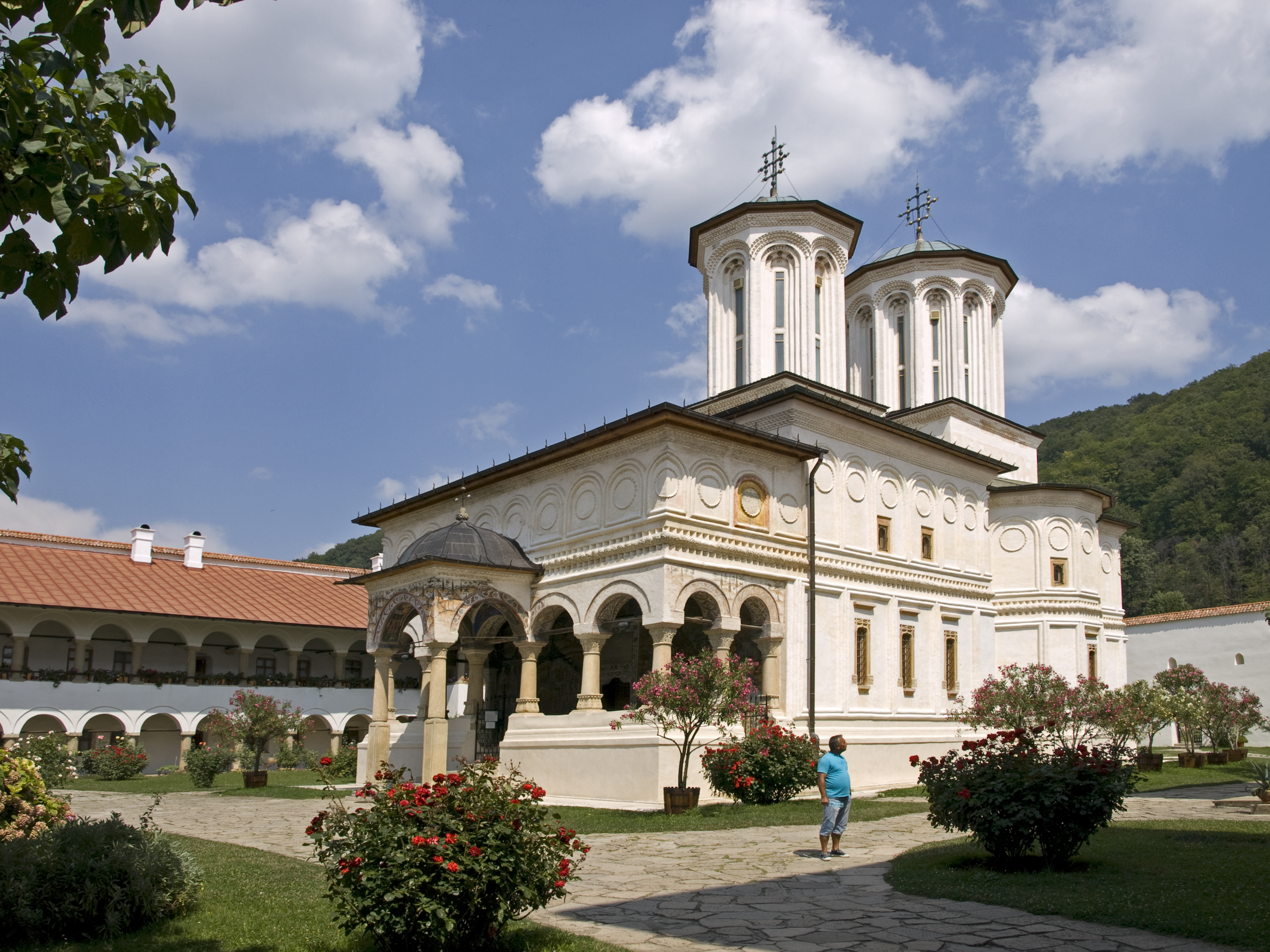
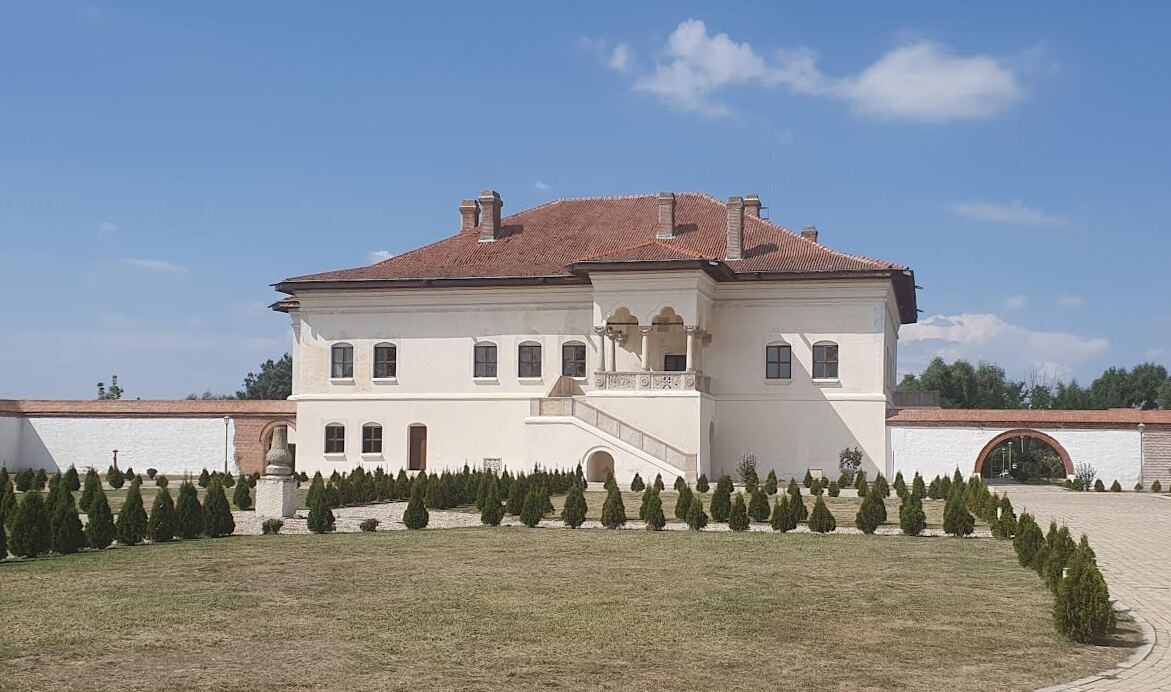
- Top: The Kretzulescu Church in Bucharest (Romania); Centre: The Horezu Monastery in Horezu (Romania); Bottom: The Potlogi Palace in Dâmbovița County (Romania)
- Years active: Reign of Constantin Brâncoveanu
- Location: Romania (Wallachia)

Brâncovenesc art or Brâncovenesc style (Romanian pronunciation: [brɨŋkovenesk]; Romanian: artă brâncovenească or stil brâncovenesc), also known as the Wallachian Renaissance or the Romanian Renaissance, is an artistic style that evolved during the administration of Prince Constantin Brâncoveanu in the late 17th and early 18th centuries. Brâncoveanu was the domn and voivode of the Principality of Wallachia (between 1688 and 1714), an extremely wealthy aristocrat, and a builder of fine palaces and churches. Brâncovenesc art was mostly focused on architecture, but also manifested through painting and sculpture.

== Architecture ==
=== Description ===
The design style developed in Wallachia, in present day southern Romania. Brâncovenesc style is synthesis between the Byzantine, Ottoman, and late Renaissance. It was also a unique hybrid of Romanian Orthodox Christian edifice styles working with the dominant Islamic architecture of the Ottoman Empire, of which the Principality of Wallachia was a vassal. The most accomplished and the best preserved example of Brâncovenesc style architecture is Horezu monastery, inscribed by UNESCO on its list of World Heritage Sites, where Brâncoveanu intended to have his tomb.

=== Revival ===
The Brâncovenesc style inspired architect Ion Mincu and other architects to create the Neo-Brâncovenesc/Neo-Romanian architectural style in the late 19th century. The style combines features from Art Nouveau, Byzantine, Italian and ethnographic architecture. Ion Mincu and his successors, Grigore Cerchez, Cristofi Cerchez, Petre Antonescu, or Nicolae Ghica-Budești declared themselves for a modern architecture, with Romanian specific, based on theses such as those formulated by Alexandru Odobescu around 1870:

"Study the remains - no matter how small - of the artistic production of the past and make them the source of a great art (...) do not miss any opportunity to use the artistic elements presented by the Romanian monuments left over from old times; but transform them, change them, develop them..."

— Alexandru Odobescu, 1870

=== Notable examples ===
- Arnota Monastery
- Brâncoveanu Monastery
- Cozia Monastery
- Govora Monastery
- Horezu Monastery
- Potlogi Palace
- Surpatele Monastery
- Sinaia Monastery
- Văcărești Monastery — demolished, frescos salvaged.

Examples in Bucharest include:

- Cotroceni Palace
- Kretzulescu Church
- Mogoșoaia Palace
- St. George the New Church
- Stavropoleos Monastery

== Painting and sculpture ==
Although Brâncovenesc art is mostly focused on architecture, it also has remarkable pictorial works. An example is the iconostasis and wall painting of the St. Nicholas Church of Făgăraș. Brâncovenesc art was also manifested through sculpture, which had a marked Venetian influence.

== See also ==
- Early Modern Romania
- Romanian art
- Romanian architecture
- Constantin Brâncoveanu
