= UNESCO-CEPES =

Education in Bucharest

Kretzulescu Palace, former UNESCO-CEPES headquarters

UNESCO-CEPES (Centre Européen pour l’Enseignement Supérieur – CEPES) was established in 1972 at Bucharest, Romania, as a de-centralized office for the European Centre for Higher Education. The centre was closed in 2011 due to lack of funding. The centre promoted international cooperation in the sphere of higher education among UNESCO's Member States in Central, Eastern and South-East Europe and also served Canada, the United States and Israel. Higher Education in Europe, a scholarly publication focusing on major problems and trends in higher education, was the official journal of UNESCO-CEPES. The CEPES headquarters was in the Kretzulescu Palace in Bucharest.

== The CEPES member countries ==
Central Europe	Eastern Europe	South-Eastern	Other regions
Austria	Estonia	Albania	Belgium
Czech Republic	Latvia	Bosnia and Herzegovina	Denmark
Croatia	Lithuania	Bulgaria	Finland
France	Republic of Moldova	Cyprus	Holy See
Germany	Ukraine	Republic of Macedonia	Ireland
Hungary		Republic of Montenegro	Malta
Italy		Turkey	Netherlands
Liechtenstein			Norway
Poland			Portugal
Romania			Spain
Serbia			Sweden
Slovakia			UK
Slovenia			Canada
Switzerland			USA
			Israel

== History ==
On 21 September 1972, as the only intergovernmental Centre for Higher Education in Europe region, North America and Israel, UNESCO European Centre for Higher Education (Centre Européen pour l’Enseignement Supérieur – CEPES) was established in Bucharest. The early mission of the CEPES was to encourage cooperation, to disseminate information, and to research modern trends in higher education within the Europe Region. In the early 1990s, with the fall of the communist regimes in Central and Eastern Europe, the role of UNESCO-CEPES extended its round has been broader.

on this endeavour, the UNITWIN/UNESCO Chairs Programme constituted "a major breakthrough with regard to the reinforcement of inter-university co-operation at the sub-regional, regional and interregional levels as a means to improve the quality in higher education as well as to strengthen national capabilities for higher level training and research in the developing countries."

In April 1997, the joint Council of Europe/UNESCO Convention on the Recognition of Qualifications Concerning Higher Education in the European Region was adopted, and UNESCO-CEPES assumed a Co-Secretariat function to the convention. From the late 1990s, the Centre gradually more co-worked on European Union projects aimed at the reform of higher education in Eastern and Central Europe and reinforced its cooperation with international organisations such as World Bank, OECD, and others.

In September 2003, UNESCO-CEPES was nominated a consultative member of the Follow-up Group of the Bologna Process (BFUG), charged with the accomplishment of Bologna Process goals, and the actualisation of the European Higher Education Area (EHEA).

On 25 September 2009, according as a Memorandum of Understanding (MoU) was signed between UNESCO and the Romanian Government on transitional arrangements for UNESCO-CEPES, The MoU realigns the centre's mandate with the new education landscape in Europe and provides that during the 2010-2011 period. CEPES will focus on addressing the needs of higher education of UNESCO's Member States in Central, Eastern and South-East Europe.

On 31 December 2011, the centre was closed as funding was not ensured by the Government of Romania or other countries in the region, which is a requirement for all UNESCO Regional Centres.

== Mission ==
The UNESCO European Centre for Higher Education/Centre européen pour l'enseignement supérieur (CEPES) promotes co-operation and provides technical support in the field of higher education among UNESCO's Member States in Central, Eastern and South-East Europe.

Specifically UNESCO-CEPES:

- Undertakes projects relevant to the development and reform of higher education, specifically in view of the follow-up to the 2009 UNESCO World Conference on Higher Education, and the Bologna Process aiming at the creation of the European Higher Education Area;
- Promotes policy development and research on higher education and serves as a forum for the discussion of important topics in higher education;
- Gathers and disseminates a wide range of information on higher education;
- Coordinates, within the UNITWIN/UNESCO Chairs Programme, relations with a designated number of UNESCO Chairs relevant to its activities;
- Provides consultancy services;
- Participates in the activities of other governmental and non-governmental organizations;
- Serves as a link between UNESCO Headquarters and Romania.

== Recent Events ==
Date	Events
9 March 2010	Reception for Presentation of the Book Collection "Patrimoniul Umanităţii din România".
4–5 March 2010	Romanian Research Assessment Exercise, organized by UEFISCSU
24 February 2010	Programme Planning Meeting, organized by UNICEF
18 February 2010	Mutual Learning Workshop, organized by UEFISCSU
3 December 2009	Stakeholders Engagement Day, organized by Accountability and Aston Eco Management Company
20 November 2009	UN Convention Day for the Right of the Child, organized by ONG Romanian Federation for Children
26–30 October 2009	The Art Exhibition organized by UNESCO-CEPES on the occasion of UN DAY 2009
23 October 2009	Opening Ceremony of the Art exposition "Our World; Our Climate"
27 September 2009	First Forum on Energy Efficiency in Romania
24–25 September 2009	Systems Thinking for Foresight: The case of Romanian Higher Education System

== UNESCO Institutes and Centres for Education around the world ==
Including UNESCO-CEPES, there are many institutes and centres on the world that UNESCO established. following lists work as part of UNESCO's Education Programme to assist countries to tackle challenges in education.

=== Global ===
- International Bureau of Education (IBE), Geneva, Switzerland. – Enhancing curriculum development and educational content.
- International Institute for Educational Planning (IIEP), Paris, France and Buenos Aires, Argentina. – Helping countries to design, plan and manage their education systems.
- The UNESCO Institute for Lifelong Learning (UIL), (former UNESCO Institute for Education), Hamburg, Germany. – Promoting literacy, non-formal education, and adult and lifelong learning.
- Institute for Information Technologies in Education (IITE), Moscow, Russian Federation. -Assisting countries to use information and communication technologies in education.
- International Centre for Technical and Vocational Education and Training (UNEVOC), Bonn, Germany. – Improving education for the world of work.
- UNESCO Institute for Statistics (UIS), Montreal, Canada. -Providing the global and internationally comparable statistics that reflect today's education needs.
- The Mahatma Gandhi Institute of Education for Peace and Sustainable Development in New Delhi, India

=== Regional ===
Africa

- International Institute for Capacity Building in Africa (IICBA), Addis Ababa, Ethiopia. – Strengthening Africa's educational institutions.

Europe and North America

- European Centre for Higher Education (CEPES), Bucharest, Romania. – Promoting cooperation and reform in higher education in Central and Eastern Europe.

Latin America and Caribbean

- International Institute for Higher Education in Latin America and the Caribbean (IESALC), (website in Spanish), Caracas, Venezuela. – Developing and transforming higher education in the region.

Centres under the auspices of UNESCO

The five centres under the auspices of UNESCO (category 2) complement and expand UNESCO's education programme.

- Asia-Pacific Centre of Education for International Understanding (APCEIU), Icheon, Republic of Korea.
- International Centre for Girls and Women's Education in Africa (CIEFFA), Ouagadougou, Burkina Faso.
- Guidance, Counselling and Youth Development Centre for Africa (GCYDCA), Lilongwe, Malawi.
- International Research and Training Center for Rural Education (INRULED), Beijing, China.
- Regional Centre for Educational Planning (RCEP), Sharjah, United Arab Emirates.

New centres and institutes to be established

- The South-East Asian Centre for Lifelong Learning for Sustainable Development (SEACLLSD), Manila, Philippines
- The Regional Centre for Early Childhood Care and Education in the Arab States Damascus, Syrian Arab Republic

== Partner and Support Organisations ==
Partner International Governmental and Non-governmental Organizations Operating in the Field of (Higher) Education Reform and Policy Development

- Center for Higher Education Development (CHE)
- Council of Europe (CE)
- German Academic Exchange Service (DAAD)
- Education International (EI)
- Elias Foundation
- European Association for Quality Assurance in Higher Education (ENQA)
- European Quality Assurance Register for Higher Education (EQAR)
- European Centre for Strategic Management of Universities (ESMU)
- European Students' Union (ESU)
- European University Association (EUA)
- European Union (EU)
- European Commission – Eurydice
- International Association of Universities (IAU)
- Observatory of the Magna Charta Universitatum
- UNESCO International Bureau of Education (IBE)
- UNESCO International Institute for Educational Planning (IIEP)
- The Quality Assurance Agency for Higher Education (QAA)
- Organization for Economic Co-operation and Development (OECD)
- United Nations Development Programme (UNDP)
- United Nations Educational, Scientific and Cultural Organization (UNESCO)
- UNESCO National Commissions
- University of Cambridge
- World University Service (WUS)

Support Organizations of UNESCO – CEPES Activities

- British Council Romania
- Calouste Gulbenkian Foundation
- Deutsche Telekom
- Hertie Foundation
- Microsoft Romania
- National Bank of Romania
- Okian Publishing Romania
- RAO Publishing
- Samsung Romania

== See also ==
- UNESCO
- 2009 UNESCO World Conference on Higher Education
- Bologna Process
- UNITWIN/UNESCO Chains Programme
- UNESCO Headquarters
- UNESCO in Romania
