= Horezu Monastery =

Monastery in Horezu, Romania

- Mănăstirea Horezu
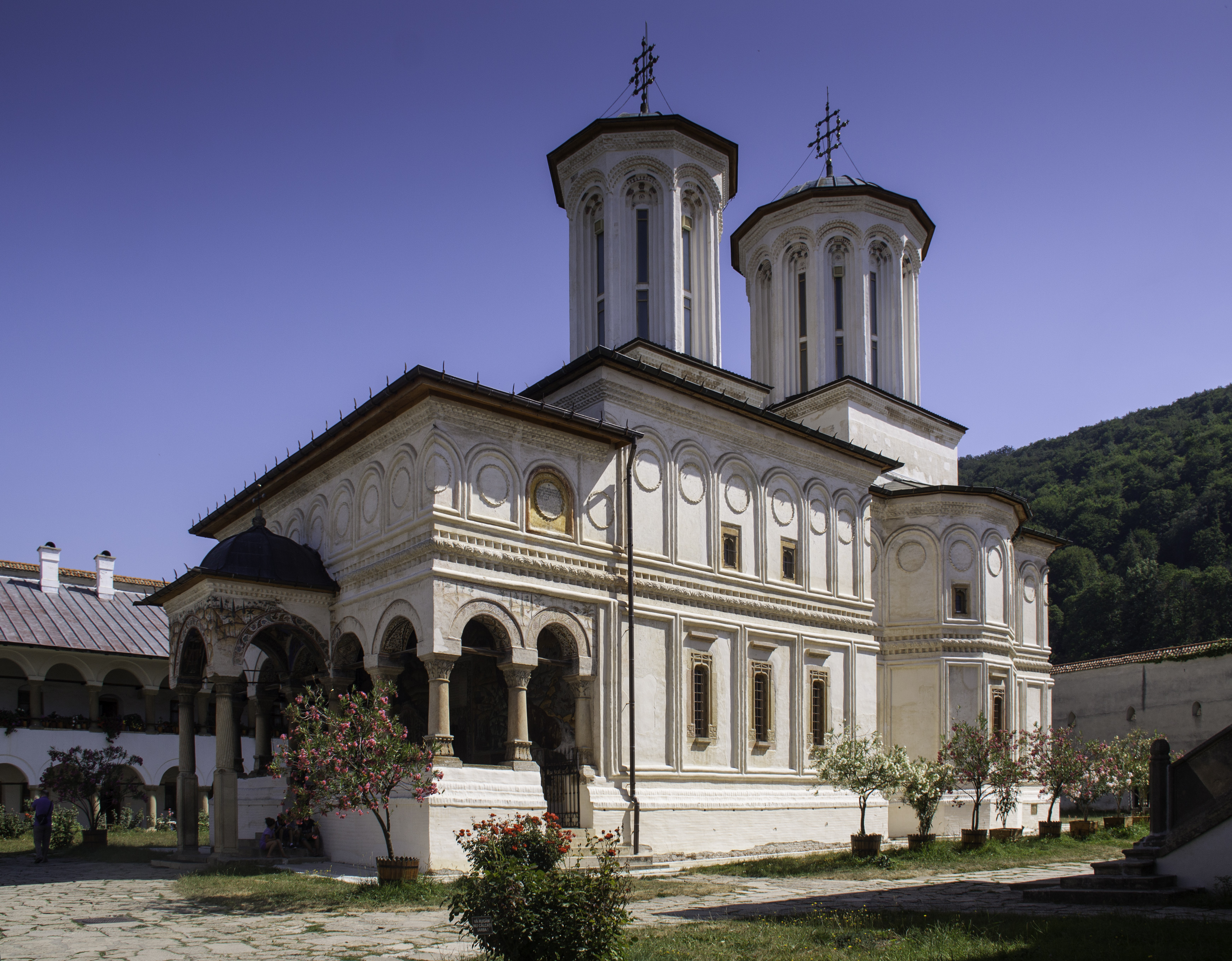
- Church of the Horezu Monastery

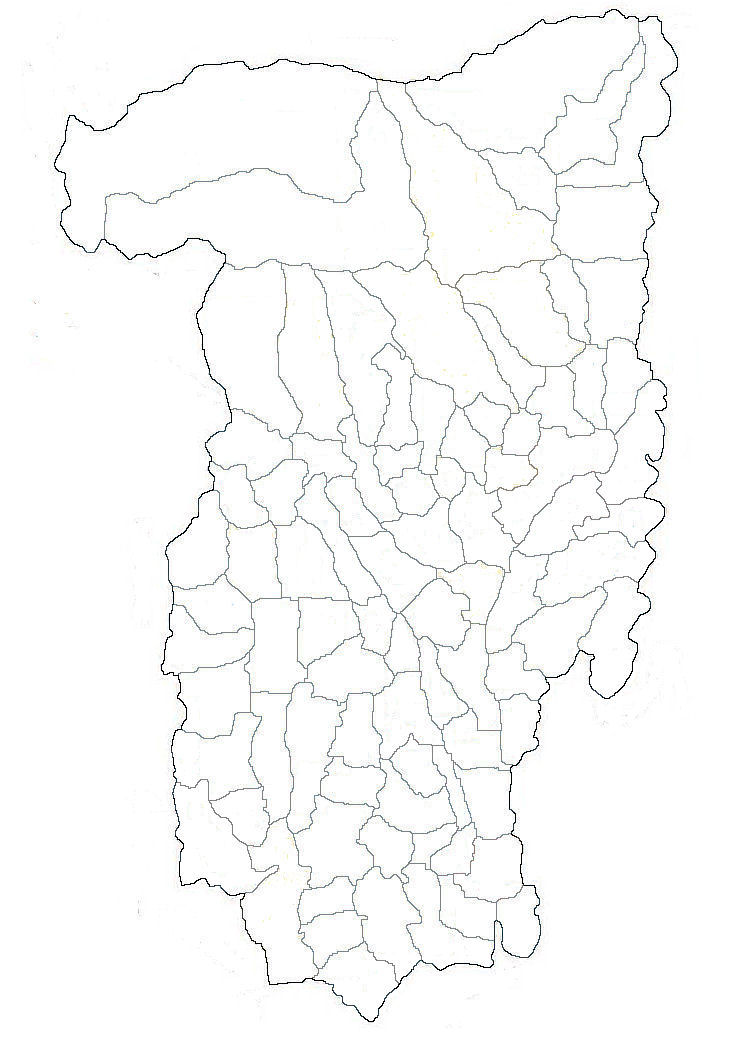
- Location within Vâlcea County

Religion
- Affiliation: Eastern Orthodox
- Ecclesiastical or organisational status: Nunnery
- Patron: Holy Great Sovereigns Constantine and Helen
- Year consecrated: 1693
- Status: Active

Location
- Location: Romanii de Sus, Vâlcea County, Romania
- Coordinates: 45°10′10.16″N 24°0′24.26″E

Architecture
- Style: Brâncovenesc
- Founder: Constantin Brâncoveanu
- Groundbreaking: 1693
- Completed: 1697

Specifications
- Length: 32 m (105 ft)
- Height (max): 14 m

Website
- Official website

UNESCO World Heritage Site
- Criteria: Cultural: ii
- Reference: 597
- Inscription: 1993 (17th Session)

The Horezu Monastery or Hurezi Monastery was founded in 1690 by Prince Constantin Brâncoveanu in the town of Horezu, Wallachia, Romania. It is considered to be a masterpiece of "Brâncovenesc style", known for its architectural purity and balance, the richness of its sculpted detail, its treatment of religious compositions, its votive portraits, and its painted decorative works.

The Brâncovenesc style, which can be found at several other churches and monasteries in Wallachia, is the only true and original Romanian style and is called "Brancoveanu art" by the name of the ruler who, in a period of constant battles between the world powers of that time, put cultural development of the country above everything and made it the goal of his life.

—

The monastery has been inscribed by UNESCO on its list of World Heritage Sites.

== Gallery ==
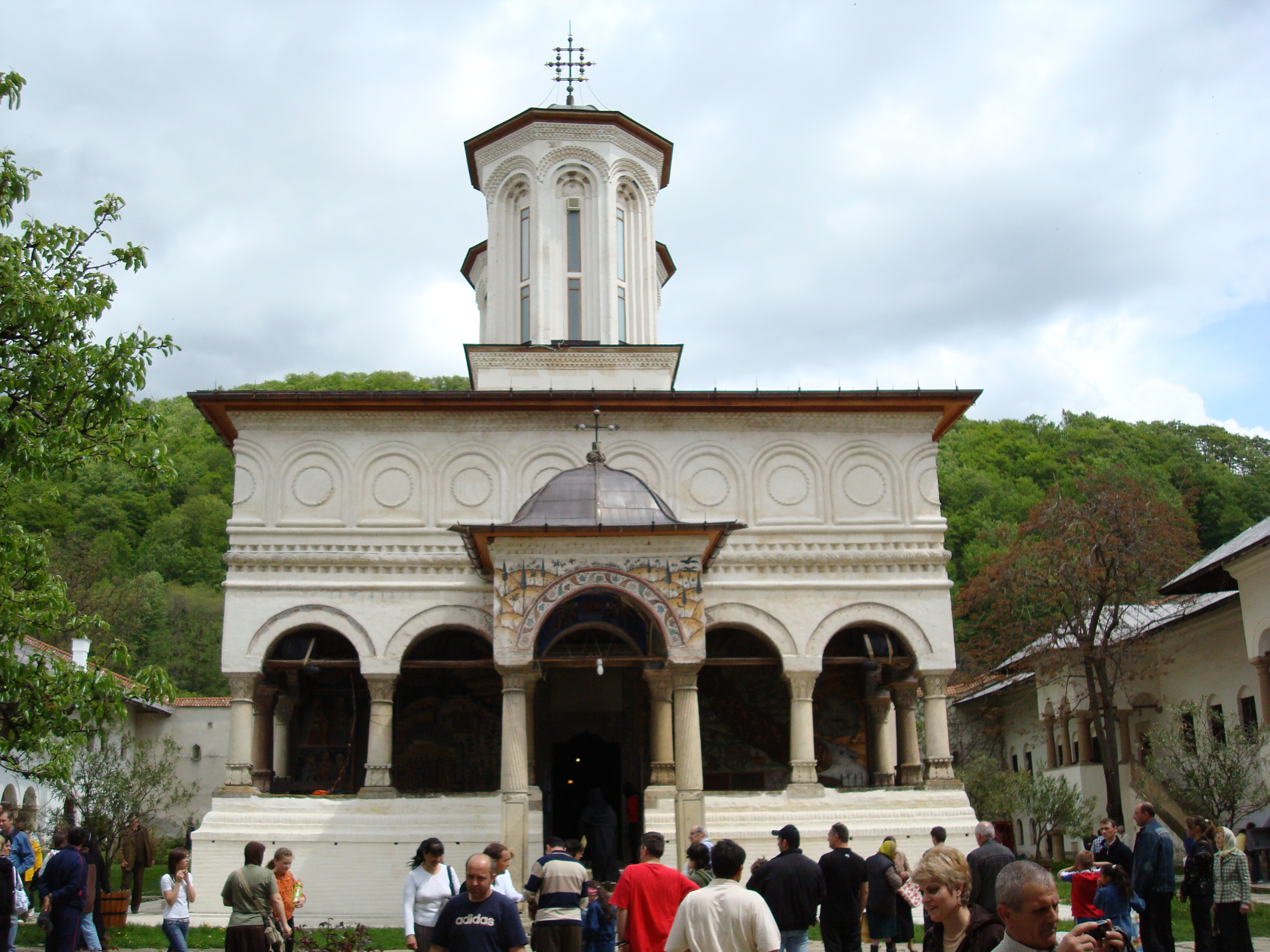

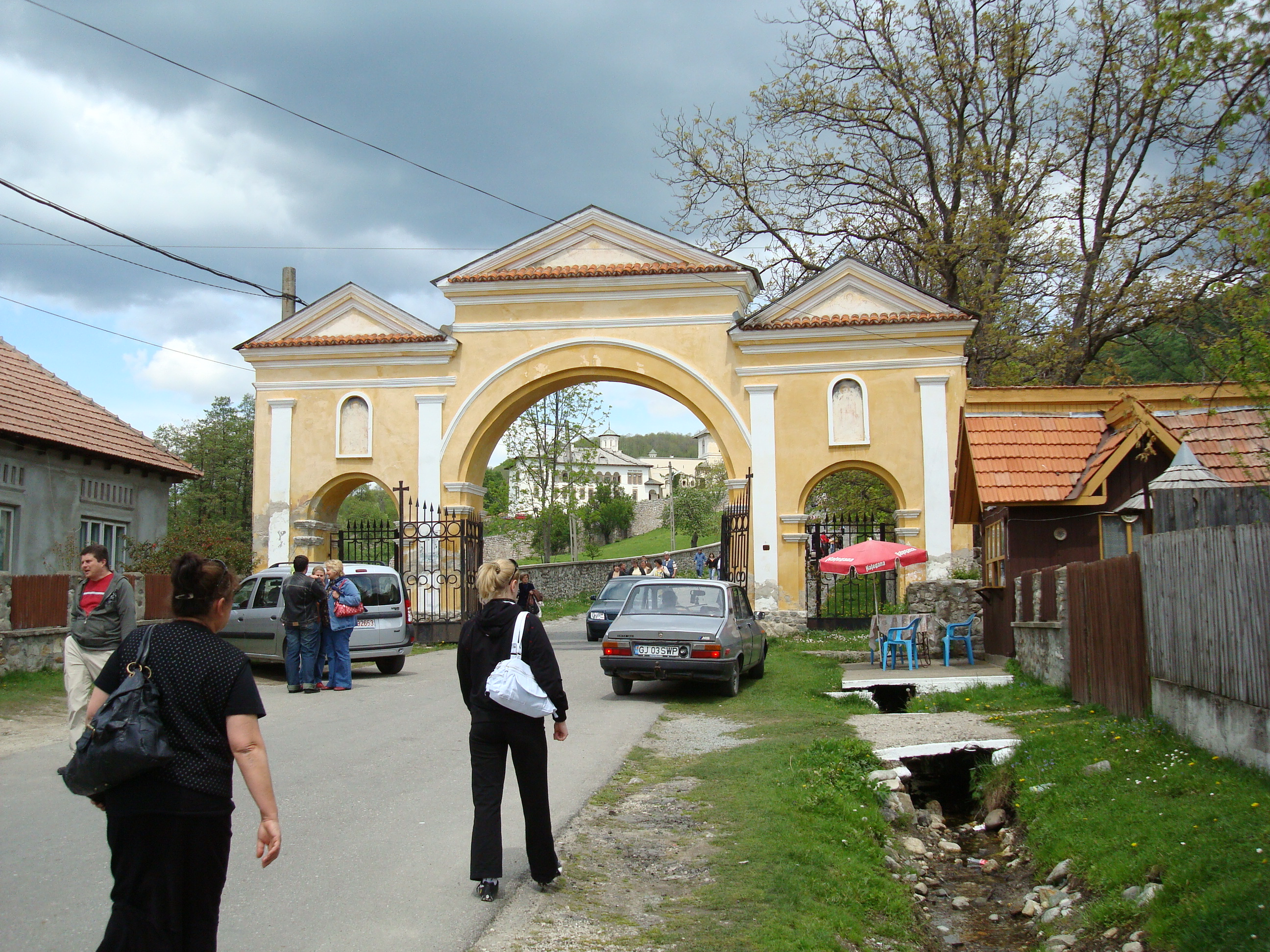

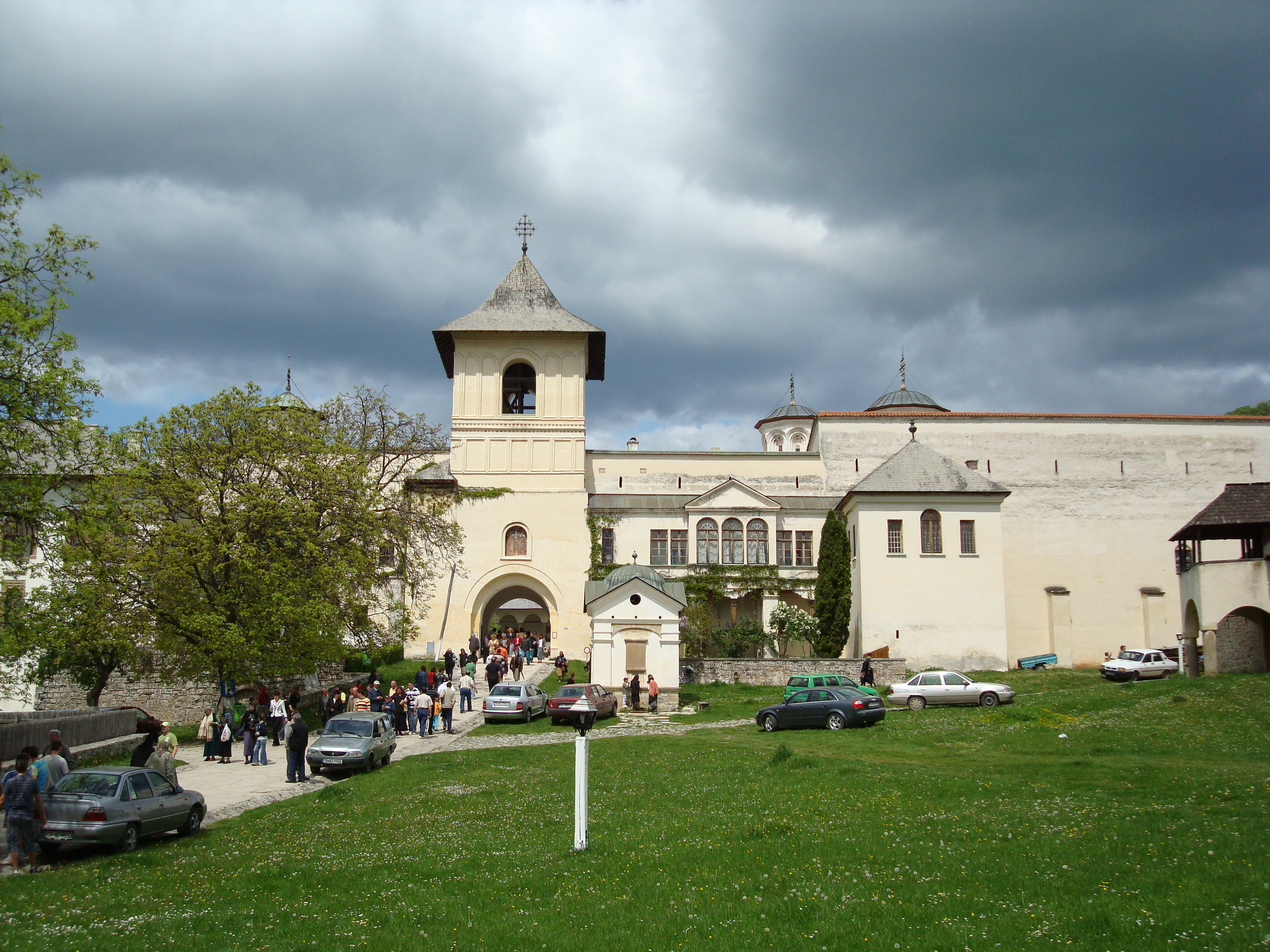

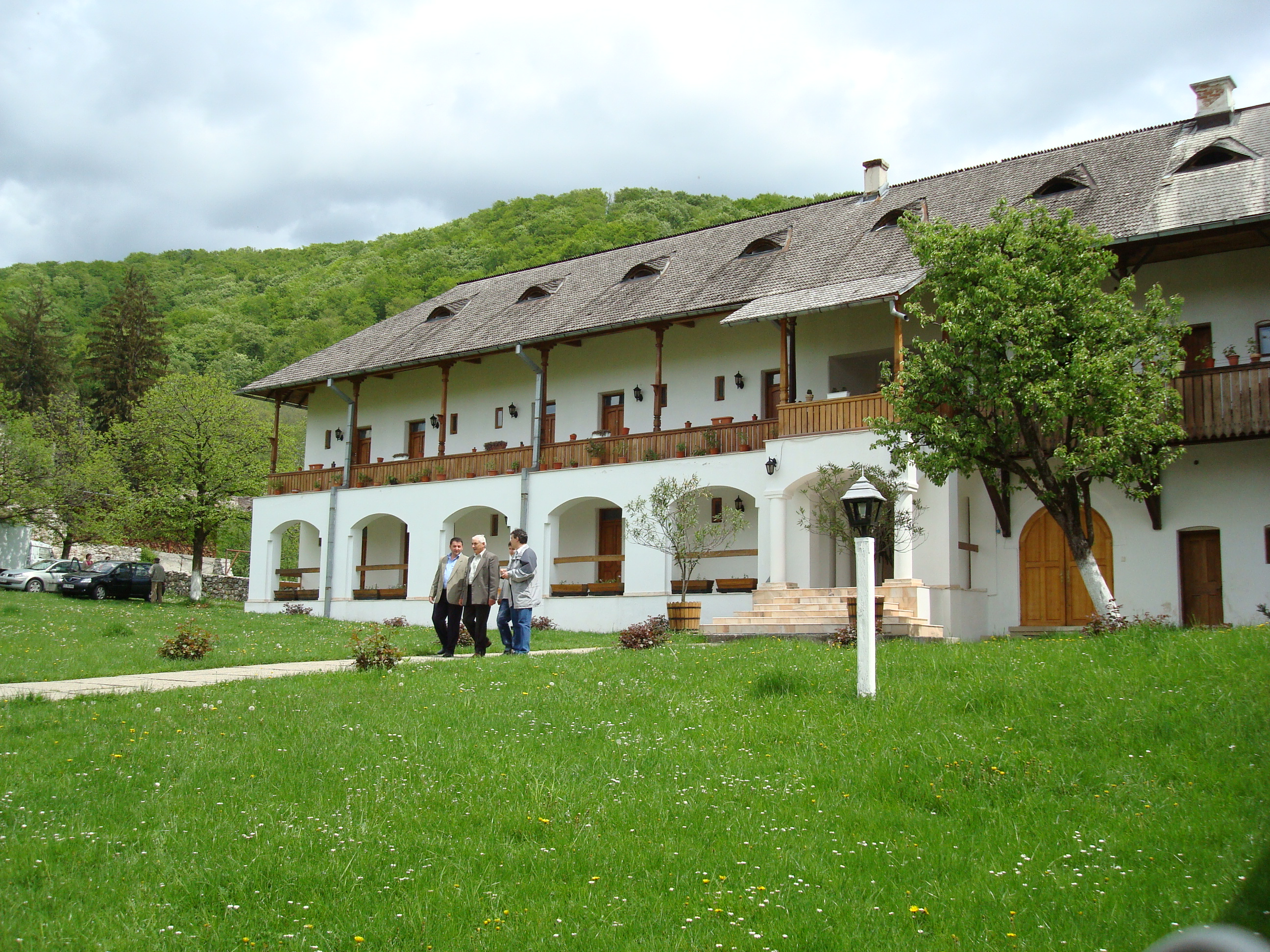

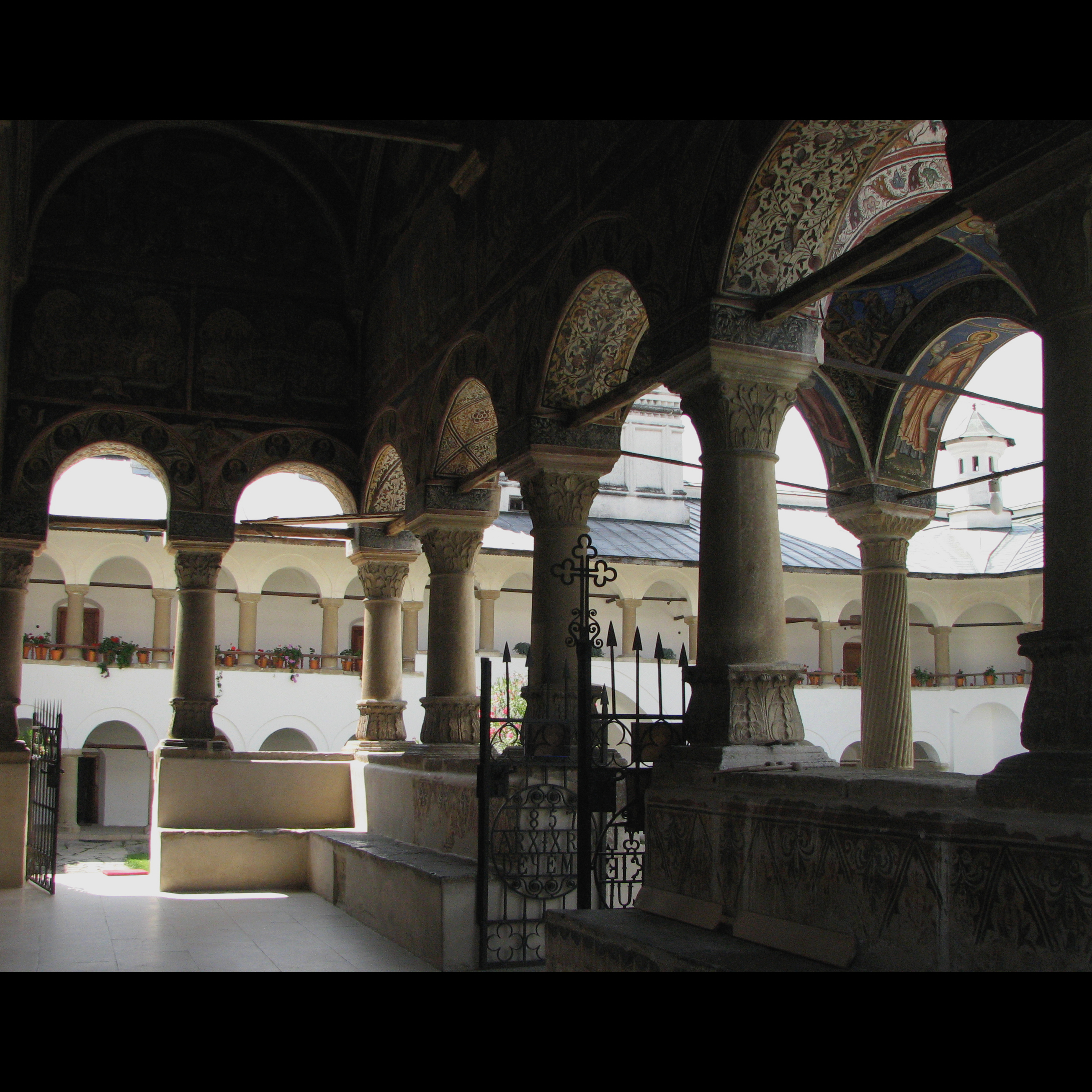

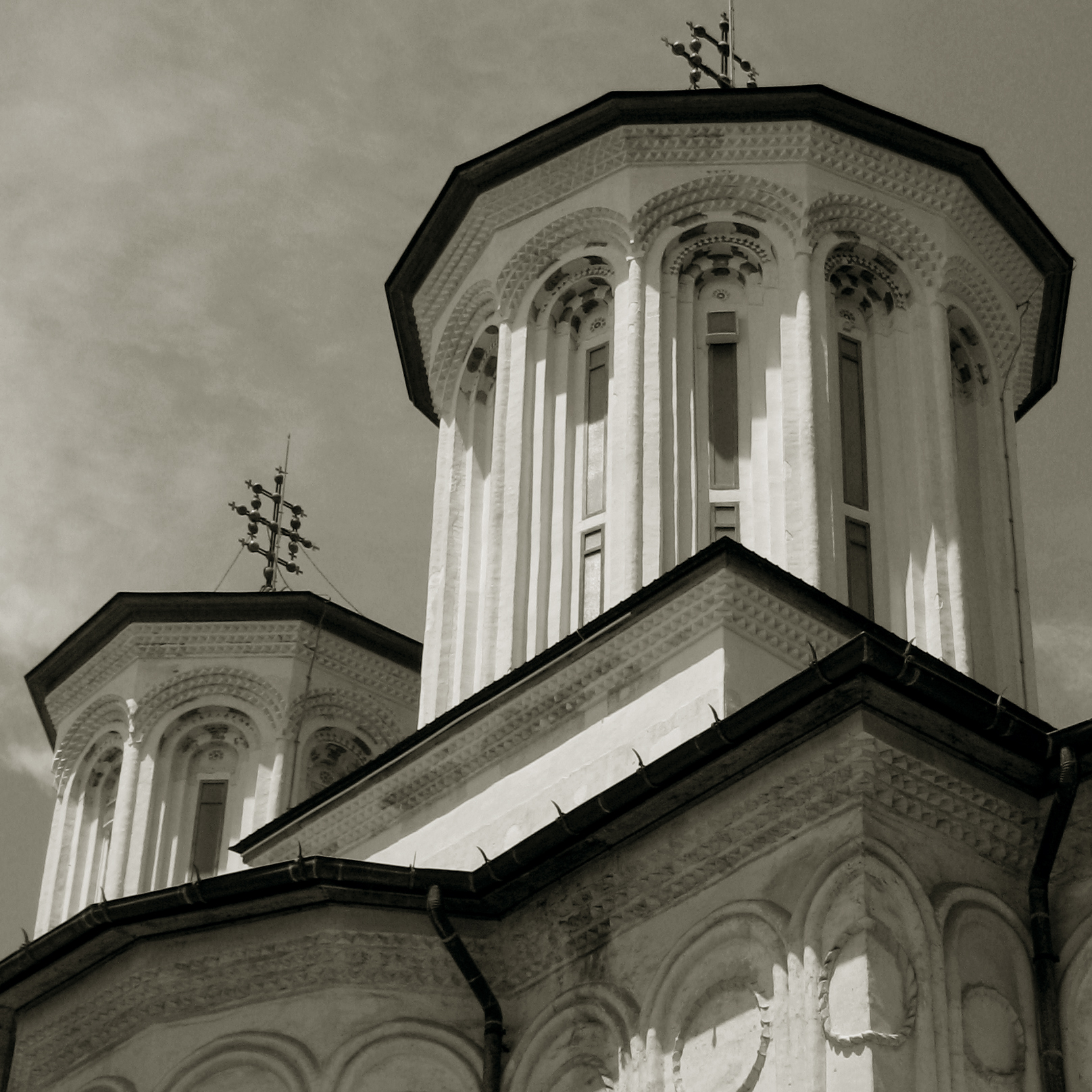

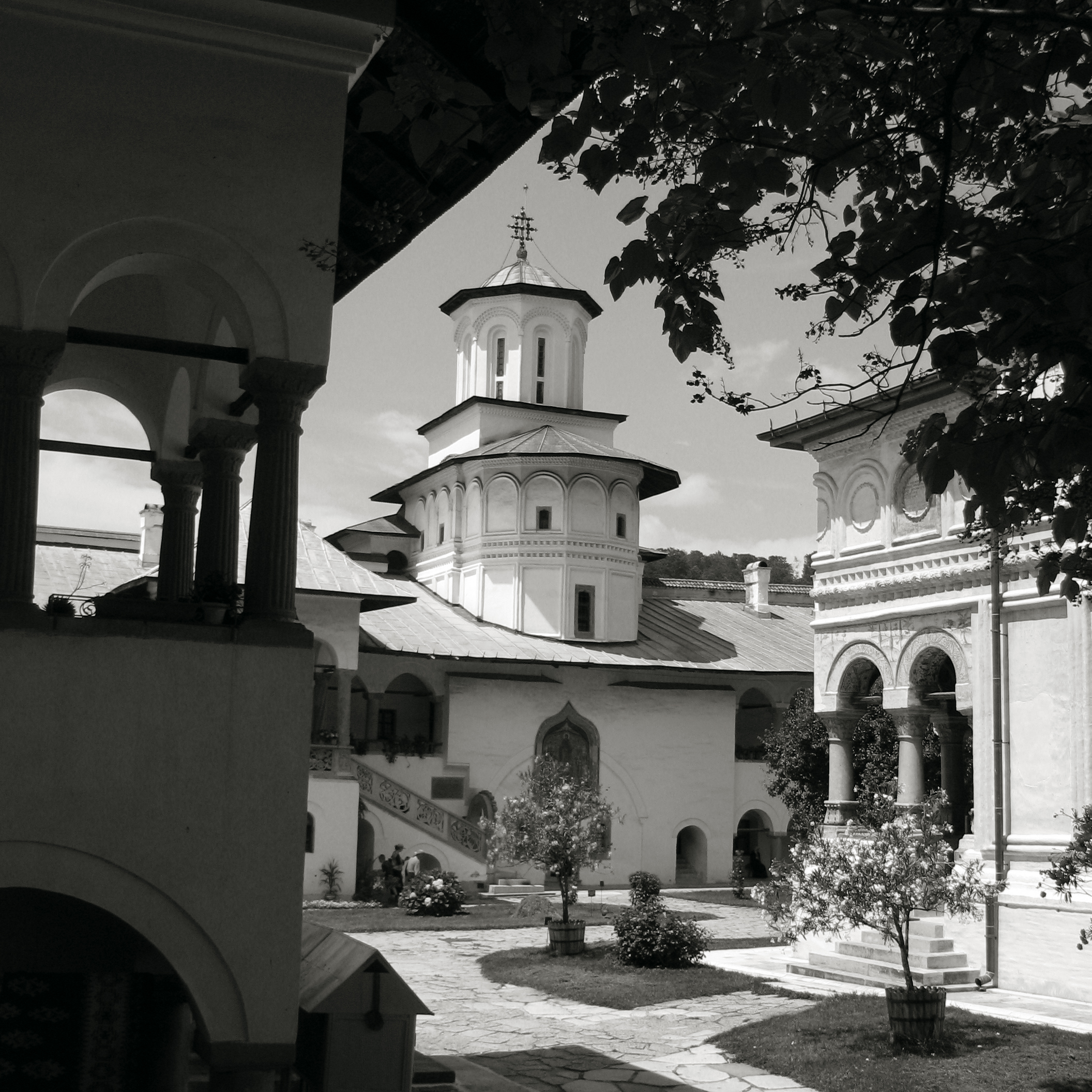

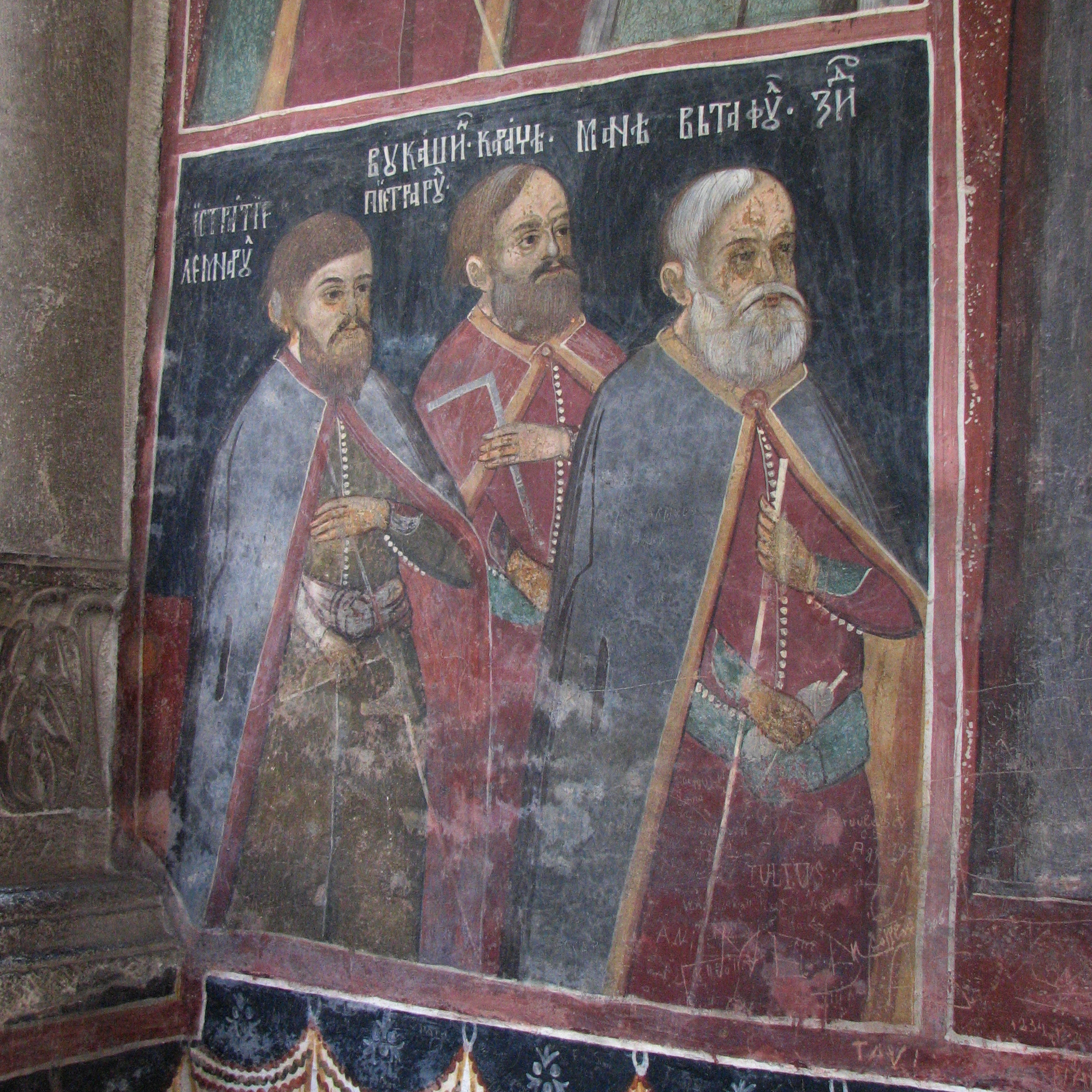

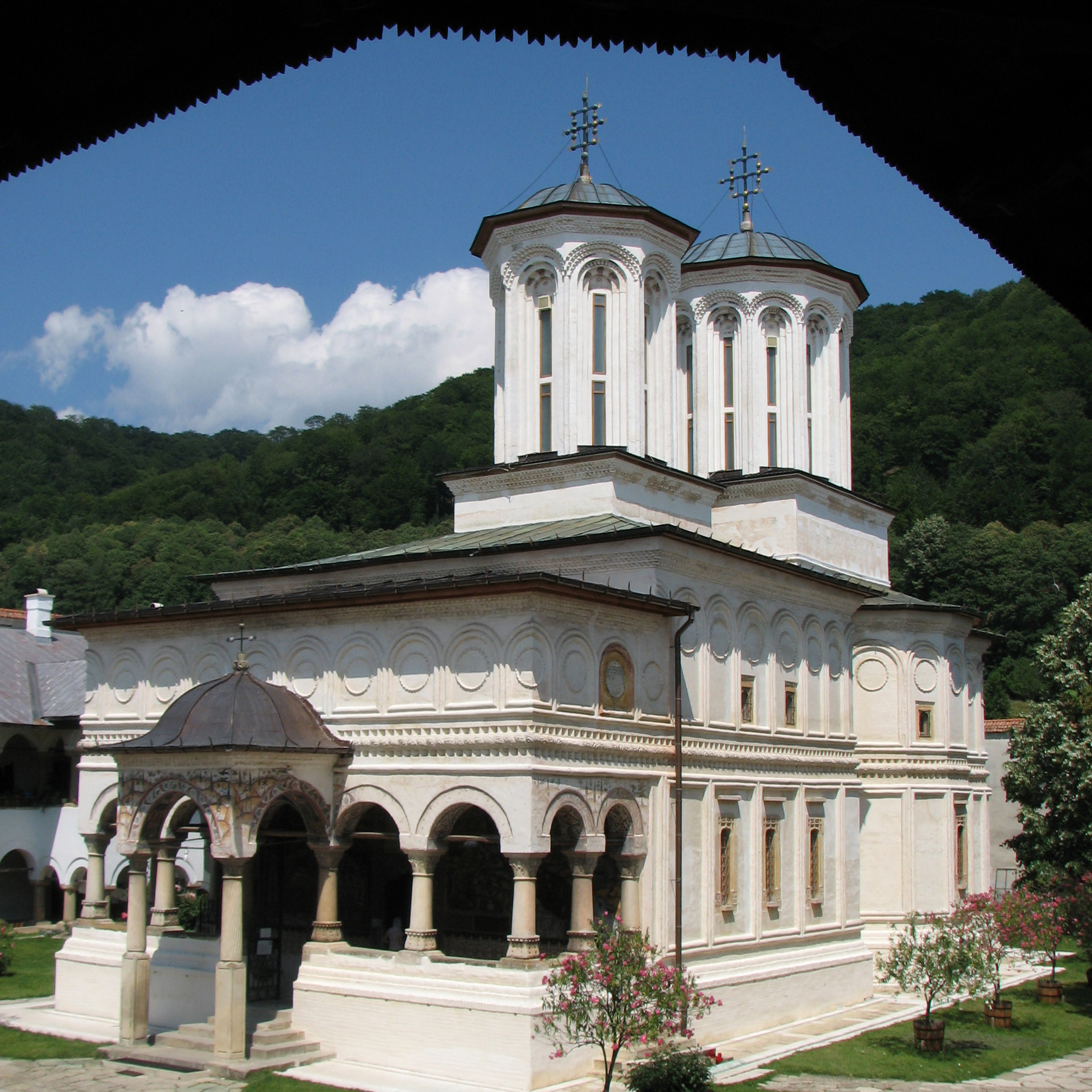

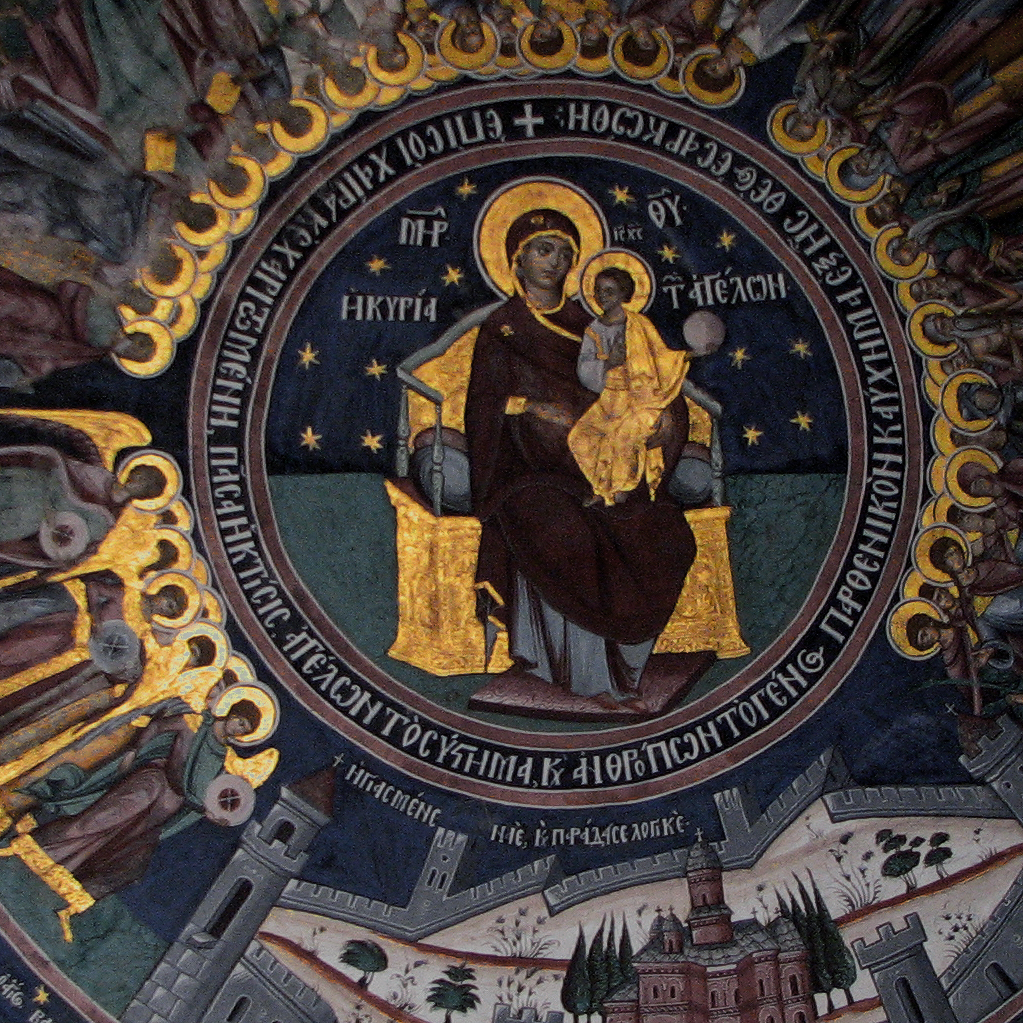

== See also ==
- List of World Heritage Sites in Romania
