= Oradea =

City located in Bihor County, Romania

Oradea Nagyvárad (Hungarian)
- County seat and Municipality
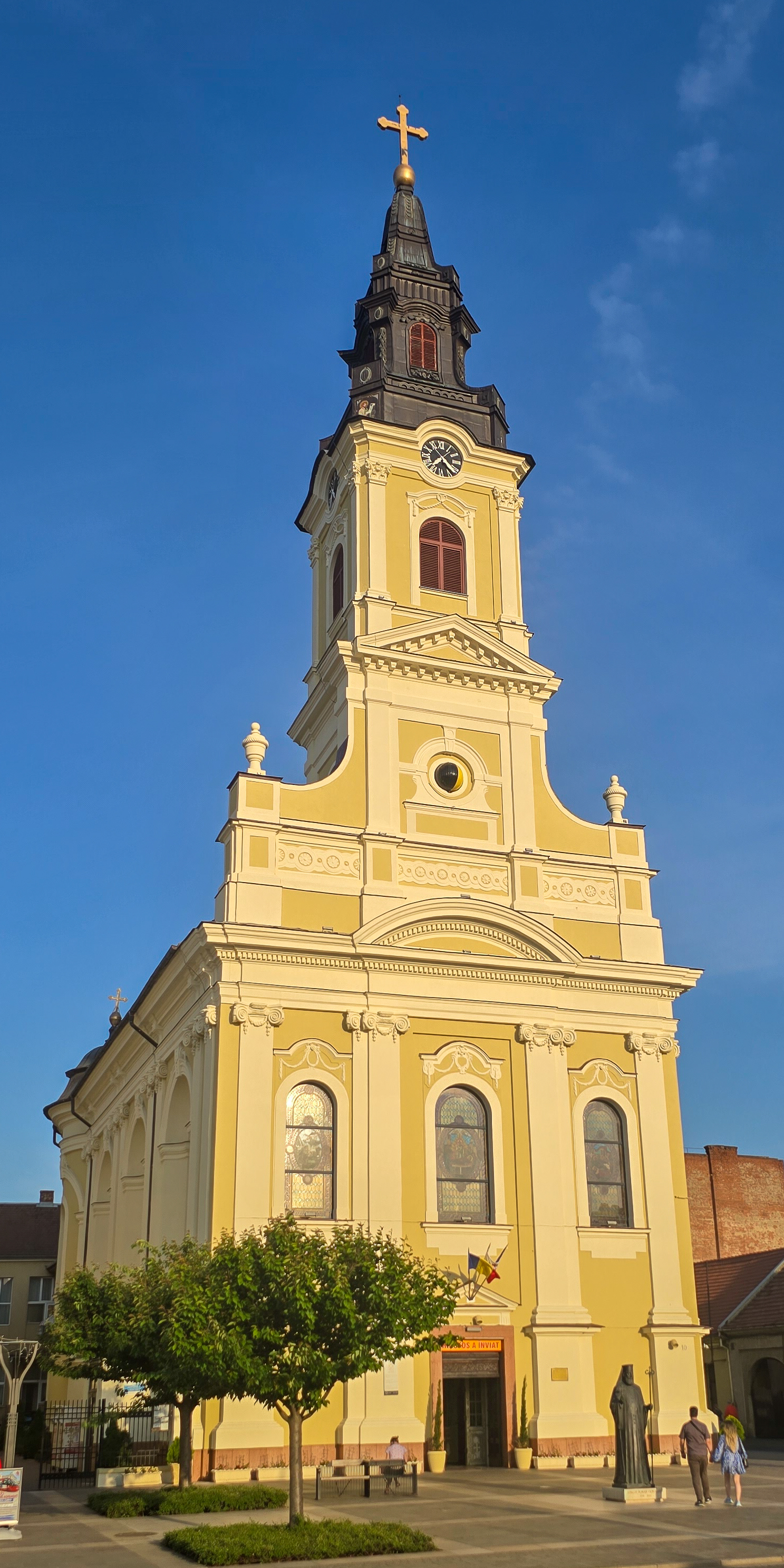
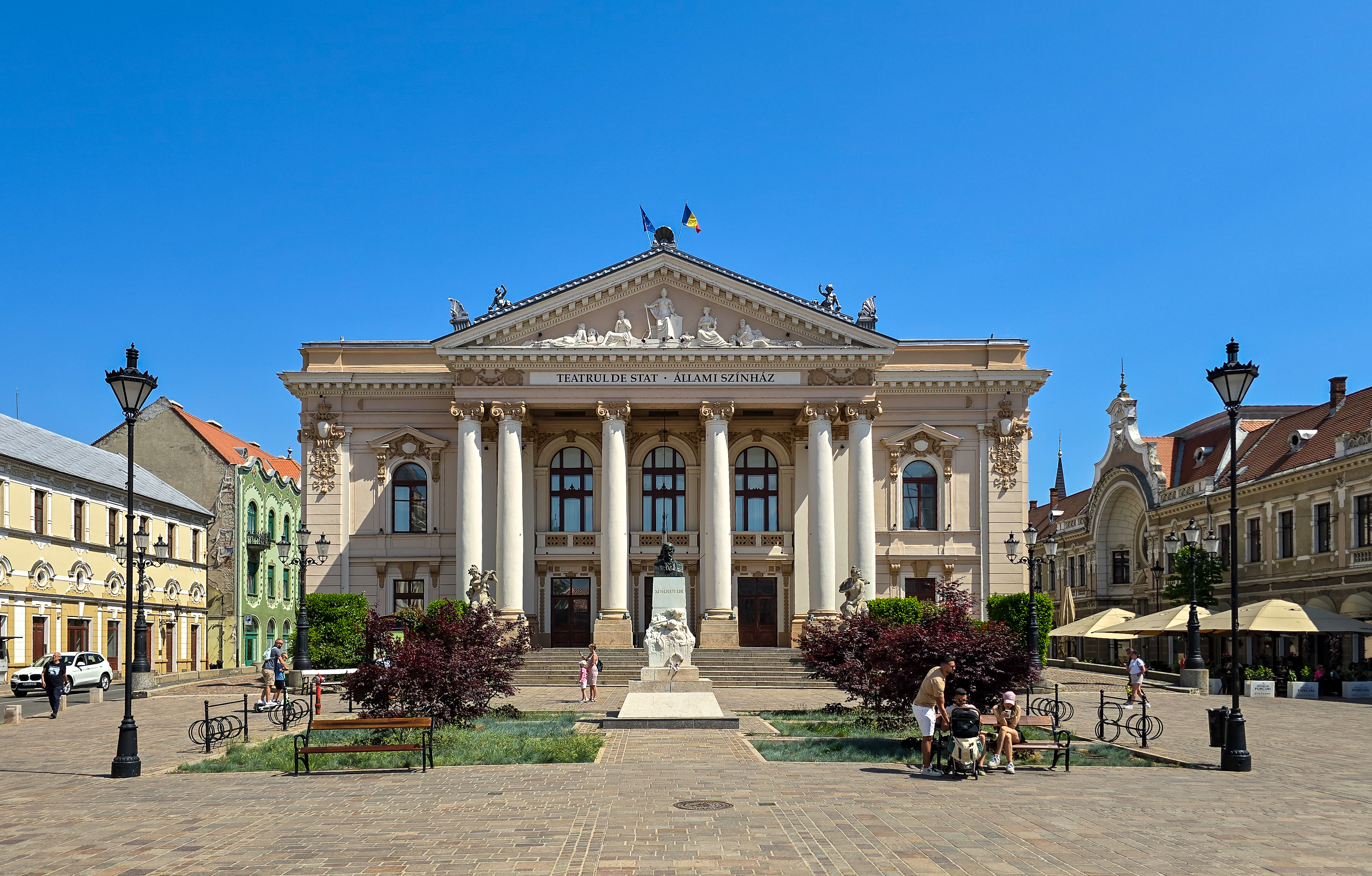
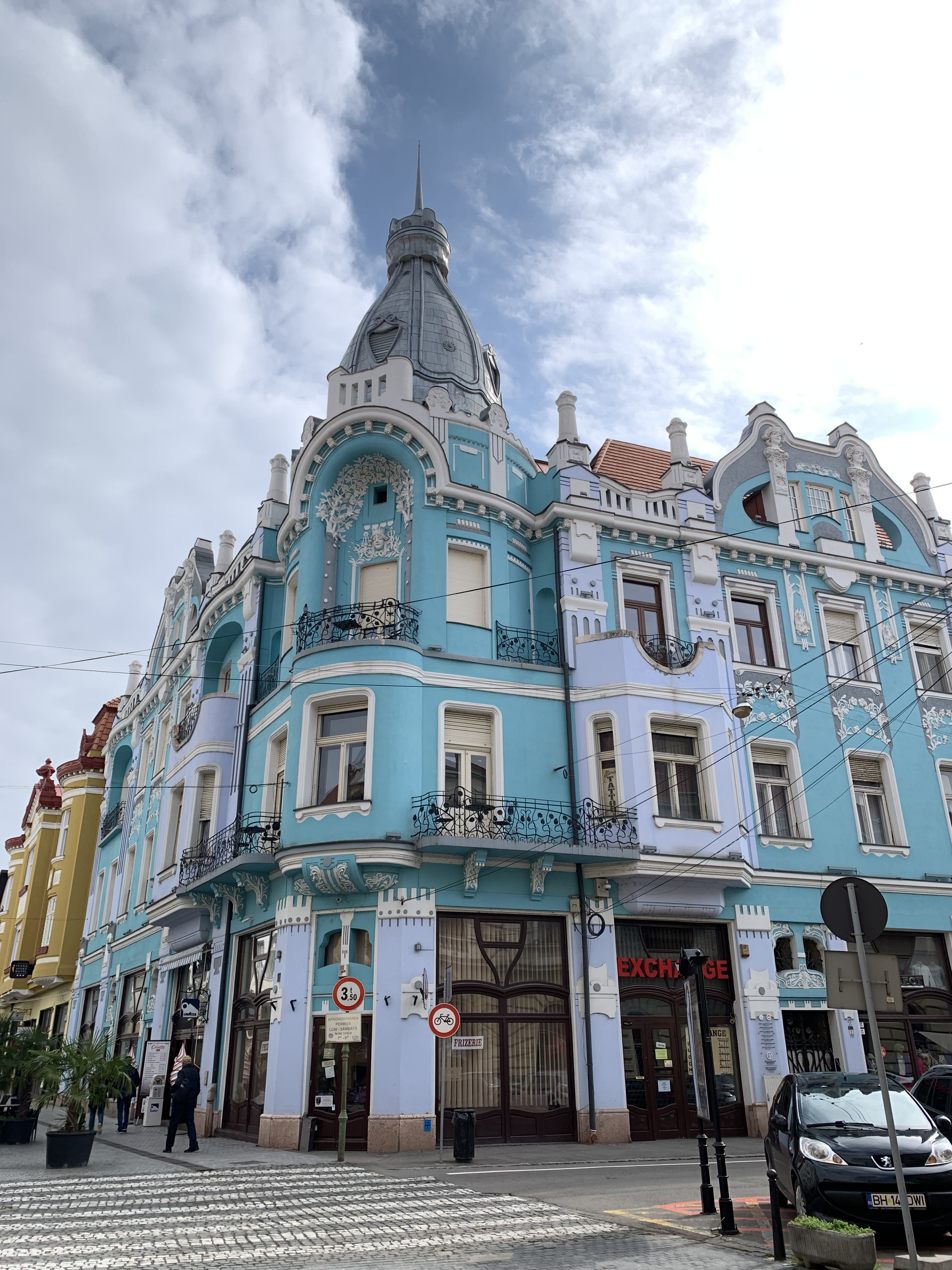
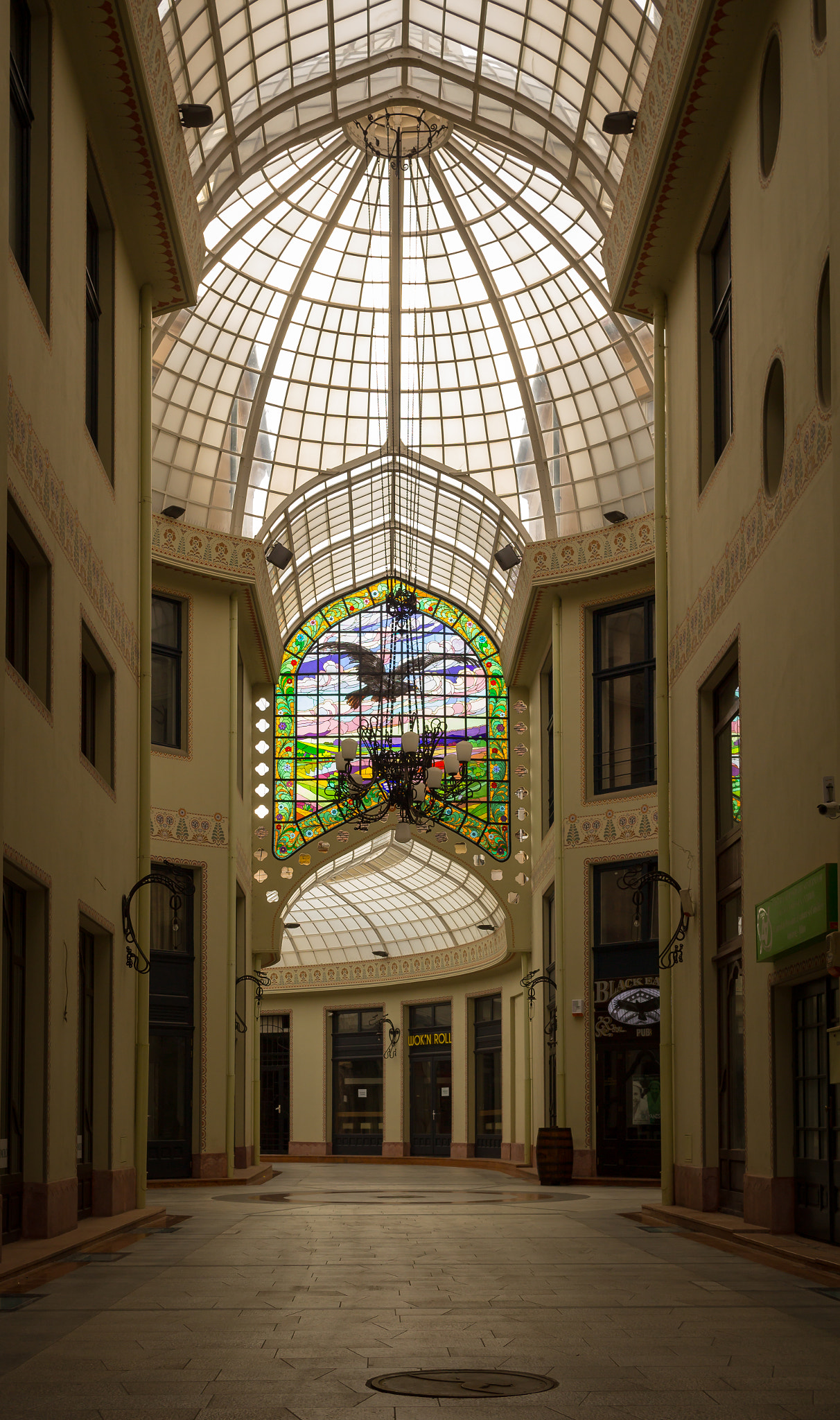
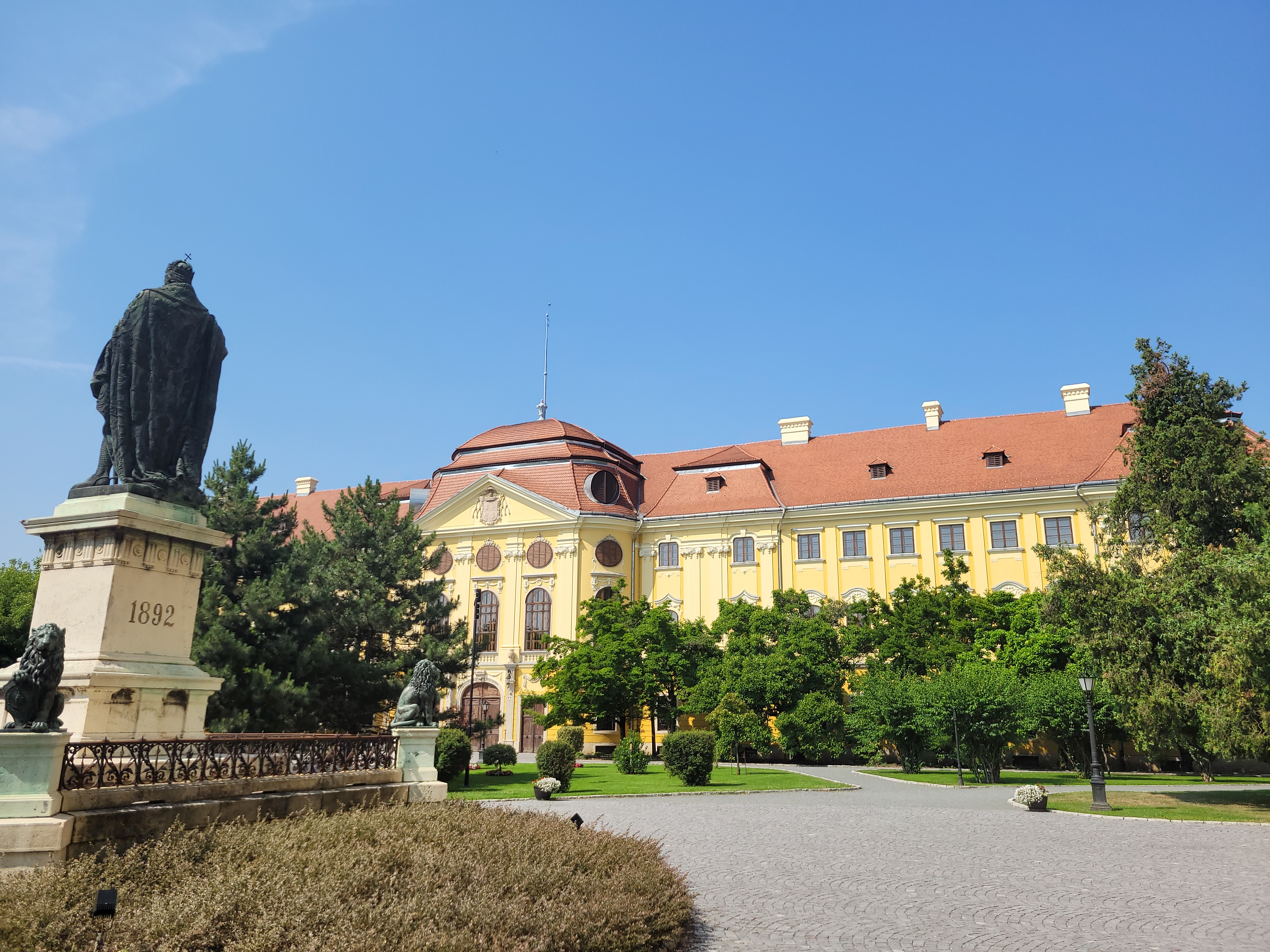
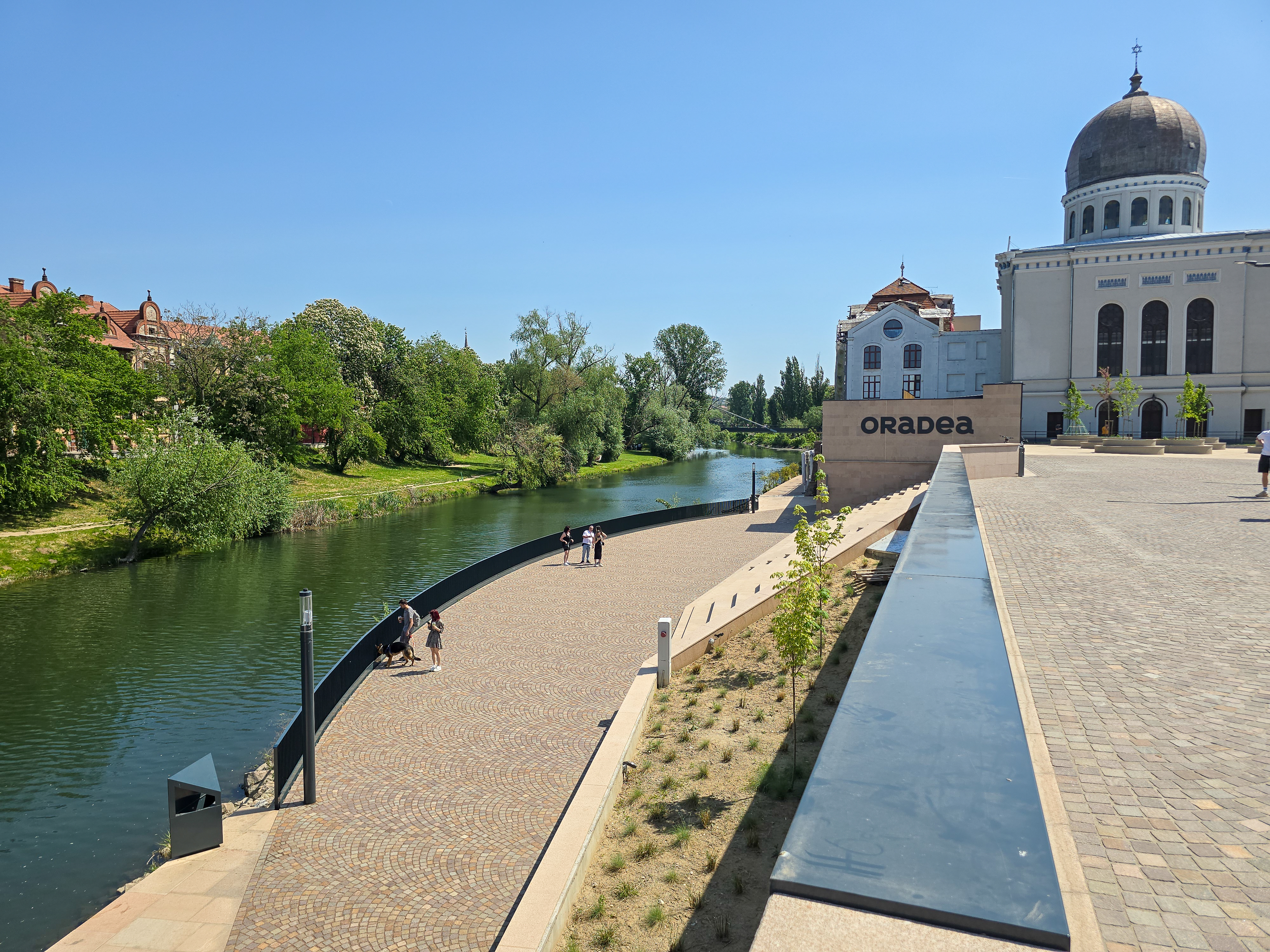
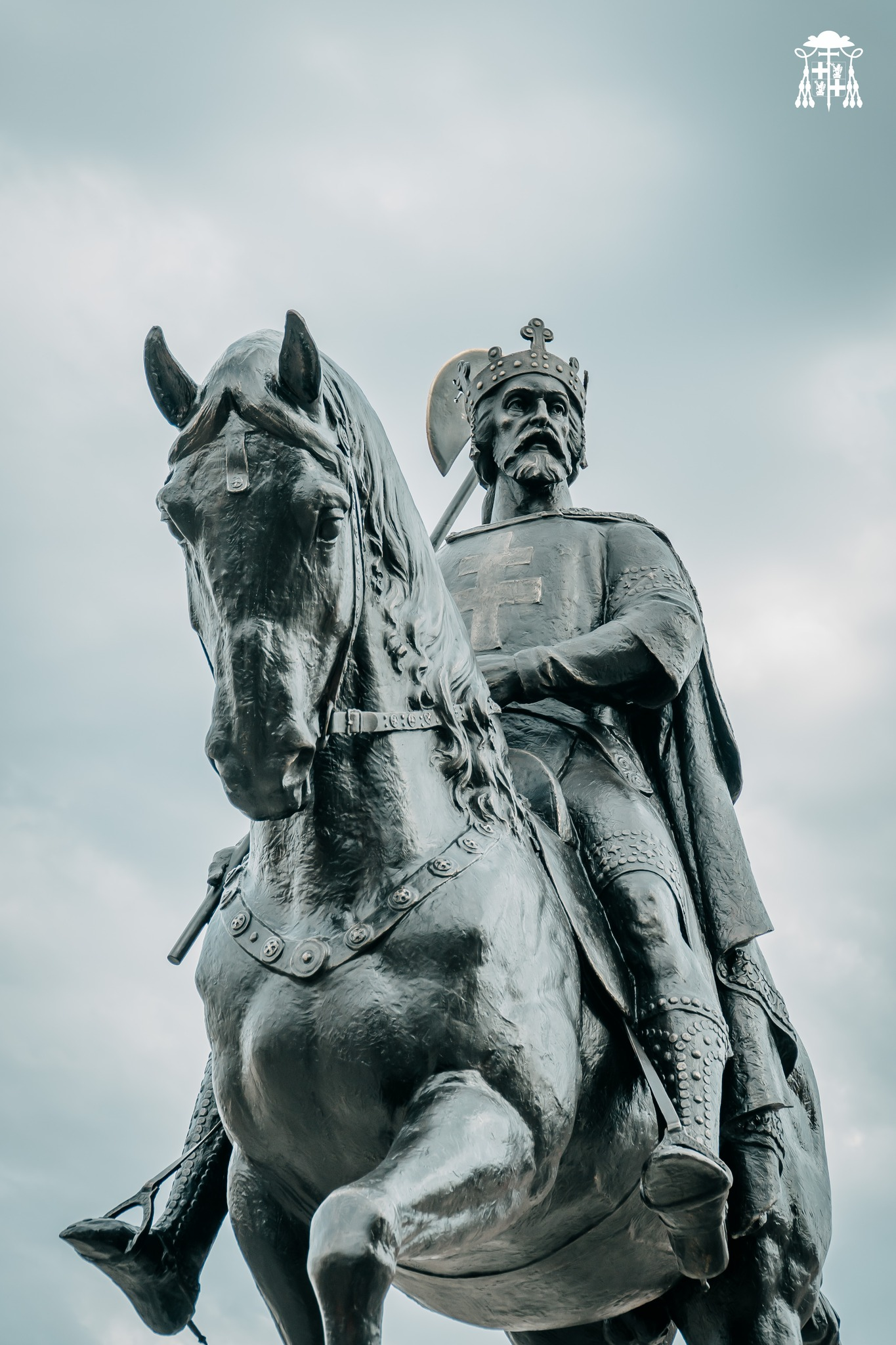
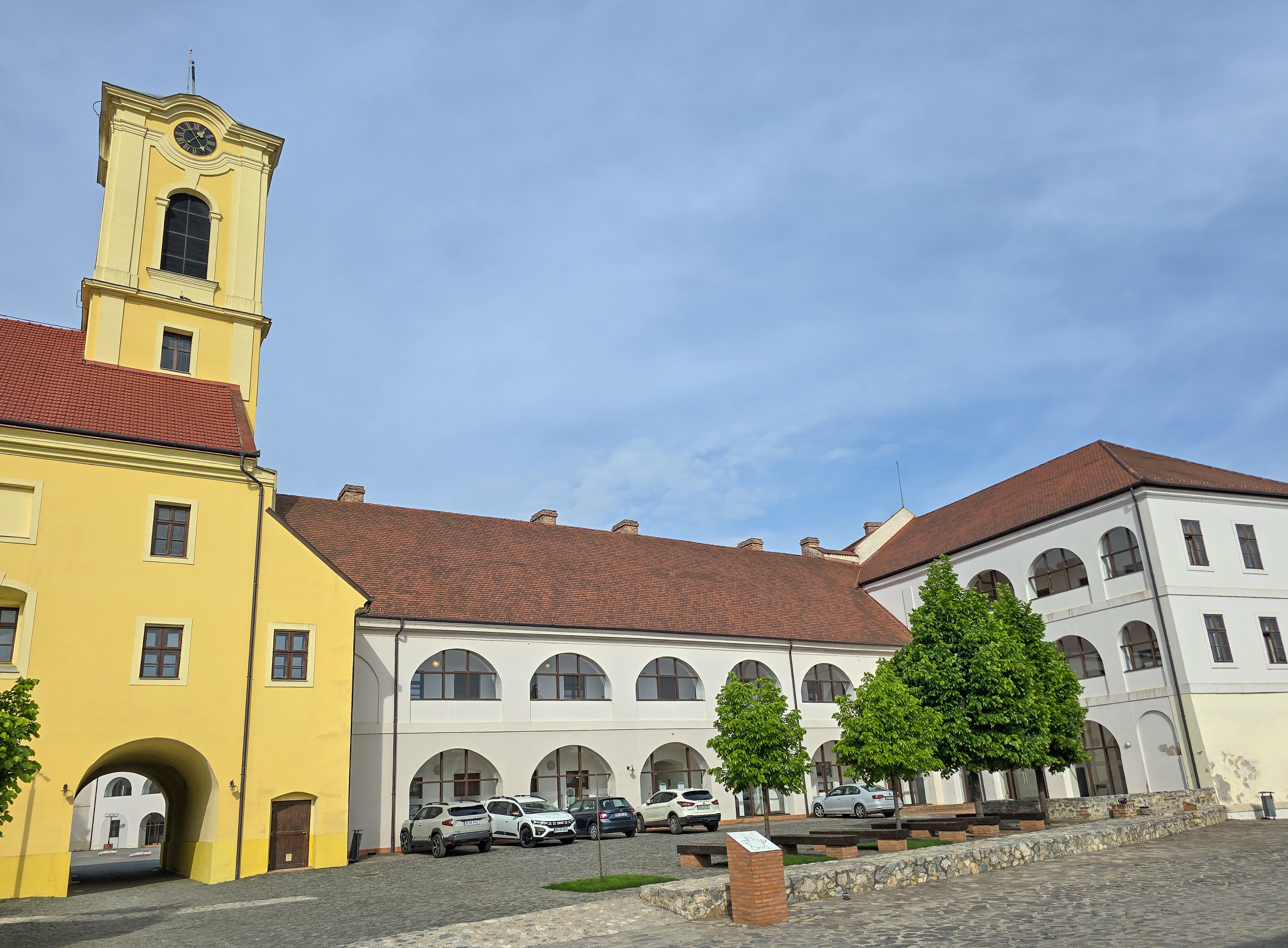
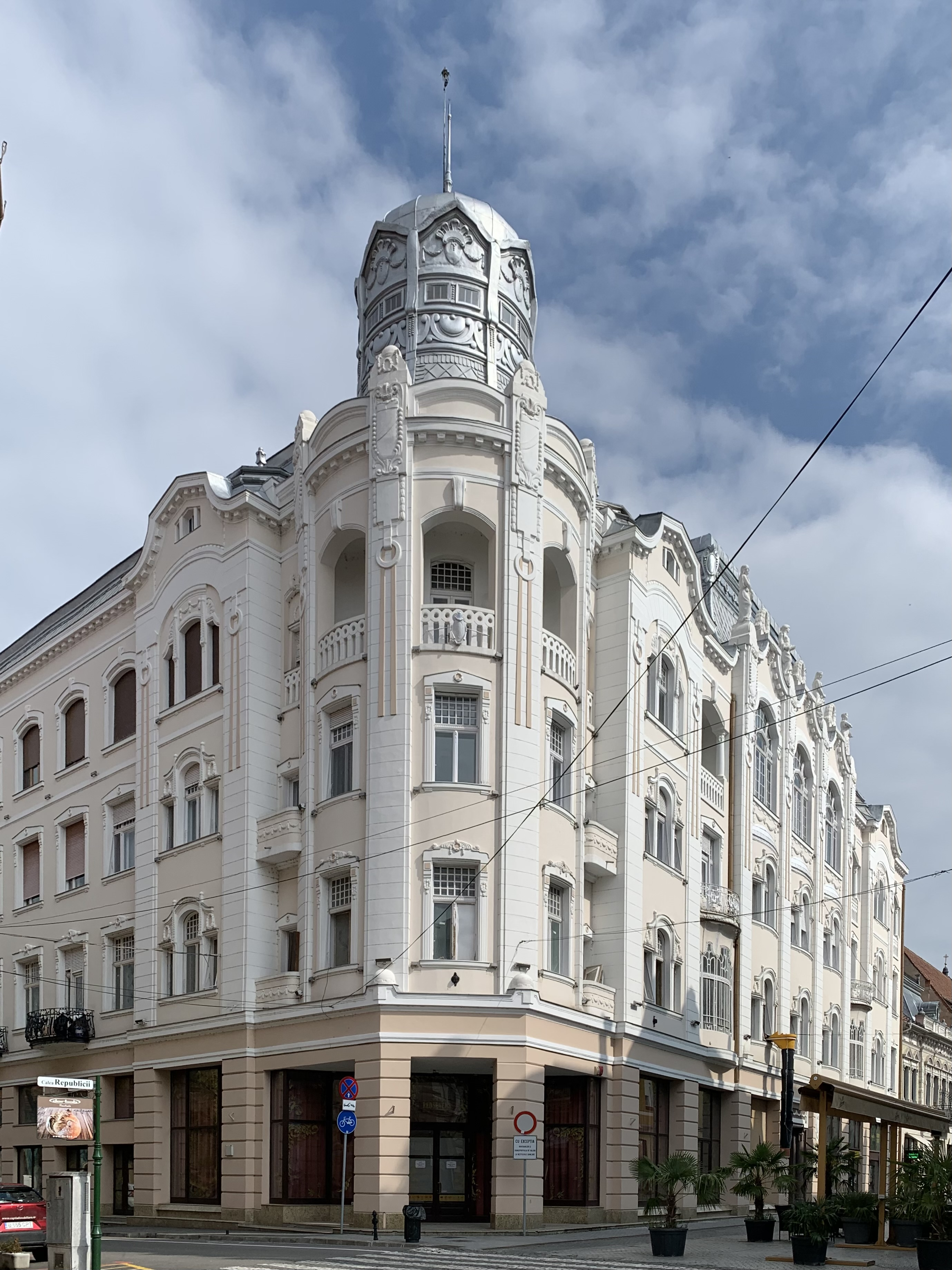
- Oradea City Hall Moon church Ferdinand Square Moskovits Palace Black Eagle Palace Baroque Palace Crișul Repede Statue of Saint Ladislaus City Museum in the Fortress of Oradea Apollo Palace

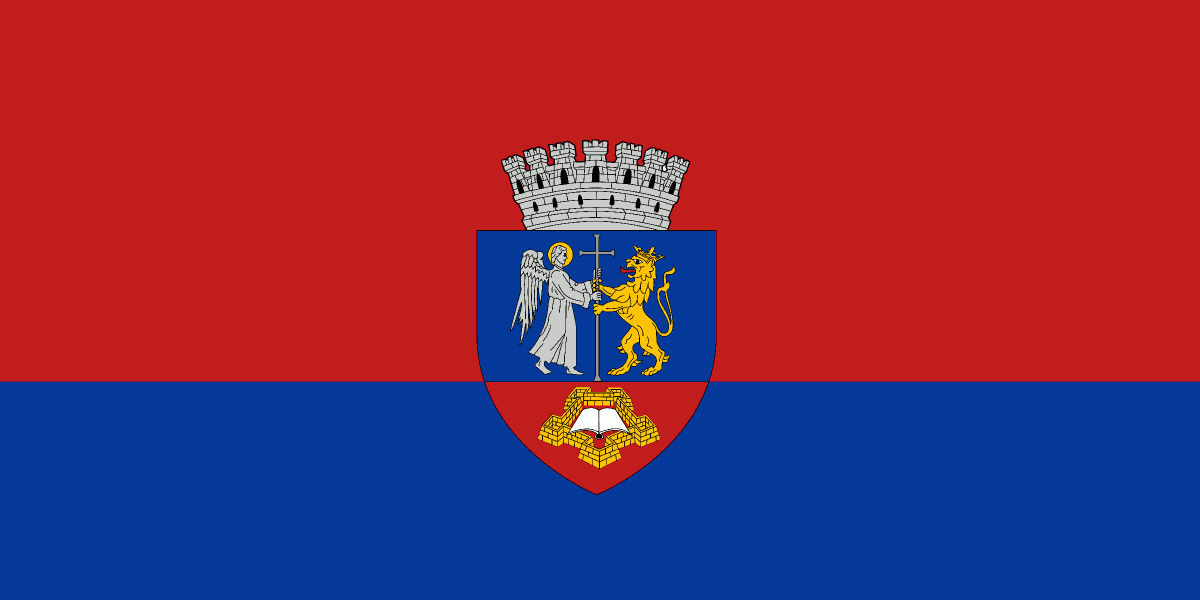
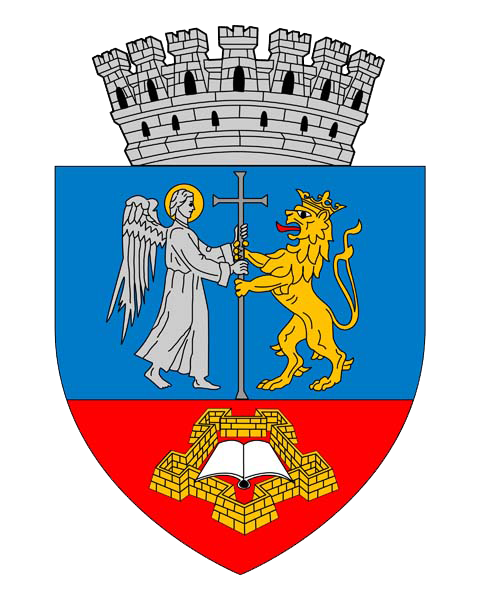
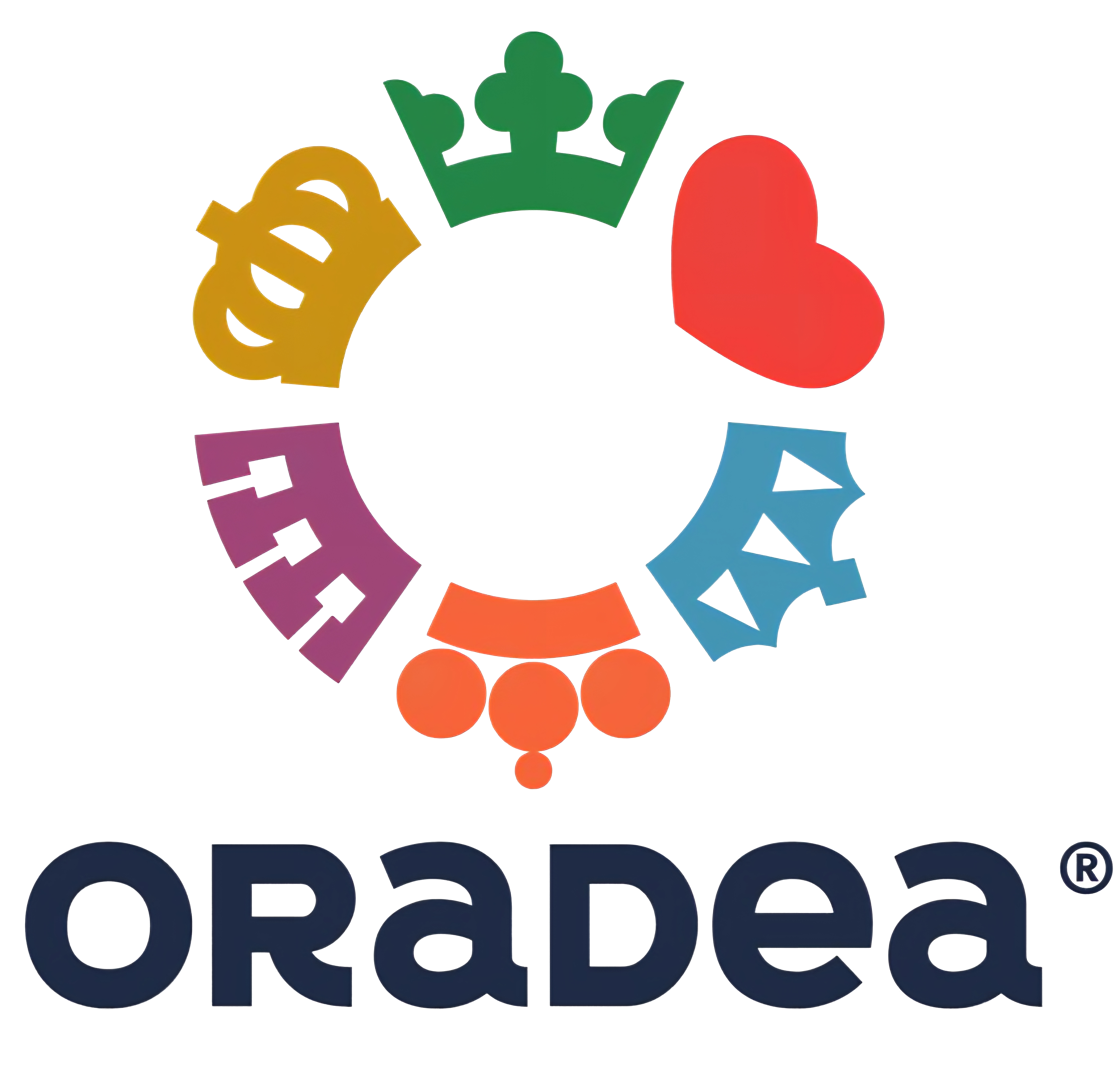
- Flag Coat of arms Brandmark

- Location within Bihor County

- Location within Romania
- Coordinates: 47°04′20″N 21°55′16″E
- Country: Romania
- County: Bihor County

Government
  - Mayor (2024–2028): Florin Birta (PNL)

Area
  - County seat and Municipality: 115.56 km^{2} (44.62 sq mi)
- Elevation: 142 m (466 ft)

Population (2021 census)
  - County seat and Municipality: 183,105
  - Rank: 9th
  - Density: 1,584.5/km^{2} (4,103.8/sq mi)
  - Metro: 245,537
- Time zone: UTC+2 (EET)
  - Summer (DST): UTC+3 (EEST)
- Postal code: 4101xx
- Area code: (+40) 59
- Vehicle registration: BH
- Official language: Romanian
- Recognized minority language: Hungarian
- Patron saint: Saint Ladislaus
- Climate: Dfb
- Website: oradea.ro

Oradea (UK: /ɒˈrɑːdiə/, US: /ɔːˈr-, -djɑː/, Romanian: [oˈrade̯a]; Hungarian: Nagyvárad [ˈnɒɟvaːrɒd]; German: Großwardein [ˌɡʁoːsvaʁˈdaɪn]) is the capital of the Crișana region in Romania. It serves as the administrative centre of Bihor County. The city is situated on both banks of the Crișul Repede River.

As of 2021, Oradea is Romania's ninth most populous city. It is located approximately 10 km (6.2 mi) from the Hungarian border. The municipality covers 11,556 hectares (28,560 acres) and lies between the Apuseni Mountains and the Crișana-Banat plain.

The Oradea Fortress is a historic fortification located within the city, whose origins date back to the 11th century when it served as an episcopal residence and religious centre. Throughout the Middle Ages, the fortress played a strategic role in the border region between Central and Eastern Europe.

The city features Art Nouveau architecture, and is a member of both the Réseau Art Nouveau Network and the Art Nouveau European Route.

== Etymology ==
The Romanian name Oradea is derived from the city's Hungarian name Nagyvárad, (often shortened to Várad). In Hungarian Nagyvárad means "large castle" or "great citadel." The suffix -ad or -da is typically used in Hungarian to form settlement names.

Oradea is also known by the German name Großwardein, and the Yiddish name גרױסװאַרדײן (Groysvardeyn). Historical names include the Turkish Varat or Varad, Latin Varadinum, and the Italian Gran Varadino. In Romanian, older versions include Oradia, Oradea Mare ("Great Oradea"), Varadia Mare ("Great Varadia"), and Urbea Mare ("the Grand City").

== Geography ==
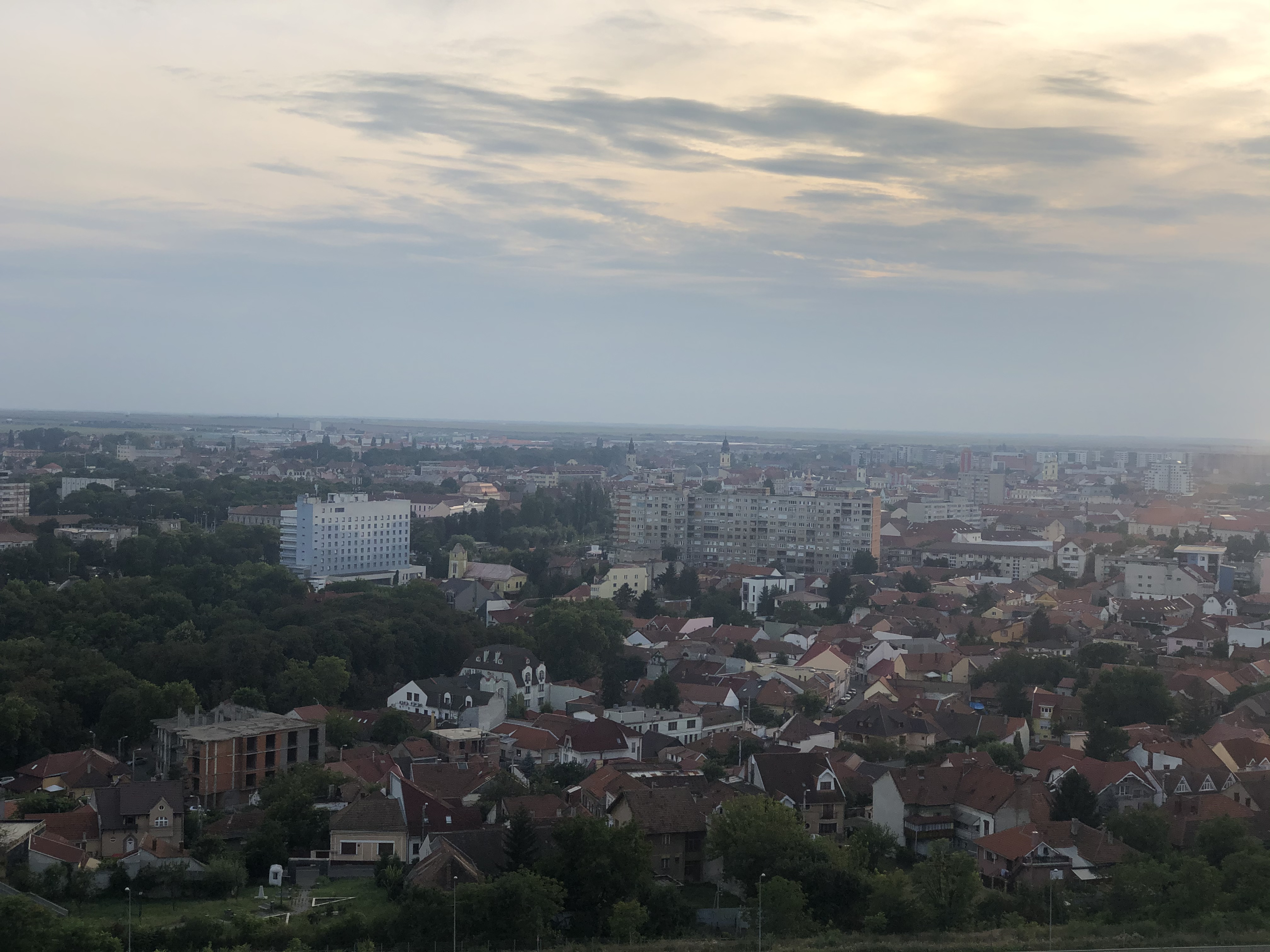
The sun sets over the city of Oradea.

Oradea is located at the meeting point of the Crișana Plain and the Crișul Repede river basin, at approximately 123 m (404 ft) above sea level. The city is bordered to the northeast by the Oradiei Hills, which form part of the larger Șes Hills range.

The urban area primarily occupies the floodplain and the natural river terraces along the Crișul Repede River, which flows through the city center. The river's flow varies seasonally, but since the early 1980s, flood management infrastructure near Tileagd has helped regulate water levels and reduce flood risk.

Oradea is also located near thermal springs such as Băile Felix, which draw tourists to the region.

=== Climate ===
Oradea has a humid continental climate (Köppen climate classification Dfa) with notable oceanic influences due to westerly prevailing winds. Summer is generally long and warm, often accompanied by cooler nights, while winter is relatively short and moderately cold.

The city's annual average temperature is 12.7 °C (54.9 °F). In July, the average temperature reaches approximately 23 °C (73 °F), whereas in January it averages 0.8 °C (33.4 °F). Annual precipitation amounts to roughly 588 mm (23.1 in), providing adequate moisture to support local vegetation and woodland.

Rainfall occurs throughout the year, but tends to peak in June, with the driest periods typically falling in late autumn and winter.

Climate data for Oradea
Month	Jan	Feb	Mar	Apr	May	Jun	Jul	Aug	Sep	Oct	Nov	Dec	Year
Record high °C (°F)	17.8 (64.0)	21.3 (70.3)	26.4 (79.5)	32.6 (90.7)	33.4 (92.1)	40.4 (104.7)	39.5 (103.1)	40.1 (104.2)	37.0 (98.6)	32.7 (90.9)	26.0 (78.8)	19.2 (66.6)	40.0 (104.0)
Mean daily maximum °C (°F)	3.8 (38.8)	7.9 (46.2)	12.8 (55.0)	17.7 (63.9)	22.4 (72.3)	28.0 (82.4)	29.8 (85.6)	30.3 (86.5)	24.6 (76.3)	17.9 (64.2)	10.9 (51.6)	5.8 (42.4)	17.7 (63.8)
Daily mean °C (°F)	0.8 (33.4)	4.1 (39.4)	7.6 (45.7)	12.0 (53.6)	16.5 (61.7)	21.8 (71.2)	23.3 (73.9)	23.6 (74.5)	18.9 (66.0)	12.9 (55.2)	7.3 (45.1)	3.2 (37.8)	12.7 (54.8)
Mean daily minimum °C (°F)	−2.2 (28.0)	0.4 (32.7)	2.5 (36.5)	6.2 (43.2)	10.6 (51.1)	15.6 (60.1)	16.9 (62.4)	17.0 (62.6)	13.2 (55.8)	7.8 (46.0)	3.6 (38.5)	0.6 (33.1)	7.7 (45.8)
Record low °C (°F)	−29.2 (−20.6)	−24.5 (−12.1)	−18.6 (−1.5)	−10.0 (14.0)	−4.0 (24.8)	1.0 (33.8)	5.0 (41.0)	4.2 (39.6)	−1.9 (28.6)	−10.5 (13.1)	−16.4 (2.5)	−26.2 (−15.2)	−29.2 (−20.6)
Average precipitation mm (inches)	36.3 (1.43)	32.3 (1.27)	35.5 (1.40)	48.1 (1.89)	65.5 (2.58)	83.3 (3.28)	64.3 (2.53)	56.2 (2.21)	47.1 (1.85)	44.0 (1.73)	48.6 (1.91)	52.2 (2.06)	588.9 (23.19)
Source: Meteomanz (2014-2026); Anuarul Statistic al României 2006

== History ==
Historical affiliations

Kingdom of Hungary 1113–1526
Eastern Hungarian Kingdom 1526–1570
Principality of Transylvania 1570–1660
Ottoman Empire 1660–1692
Kingdom of Hungary 1692–1867
Austria-Hungary 1867–1918
Hungary 1918–1919 (de jure Hungary until 1920)
Kingdom of Romania 1920–1940 (de facto from 1919 to 1940)
(Kingdom of Hungary (1920–1946)) Kingdom of Hungary 1940–1945
Kingdom of Romania 1945–1947
Romanian People's Republic 1947–1965
Socialist Republic of Romania 1965–1989
Romania 1989–present

=== Early history ===
The archaeological findings around the city provide evidence of continuous human settlement since the Neolithic period. This includes various Dacian and Celtic settlements. After the conquest of Dacia, the Romans constructed settlements in the area, most notably in the Salca district of the city and Băile Felix. According to the Gesta Hungarorum, the region was ruled by Menumorut in the late 9th and early 10th centuries until the Hungarian conquest. Its citadel was centered at Biharea. According to an anonymous royal chronicler, Menumorut's duchy was populated primarily by Khazars and Székelys. Additionally, he reported that Menumorut acknowledged the suzerainty of the Byzantine Emperor at the time, although the emperor in question was not mentioned by name.

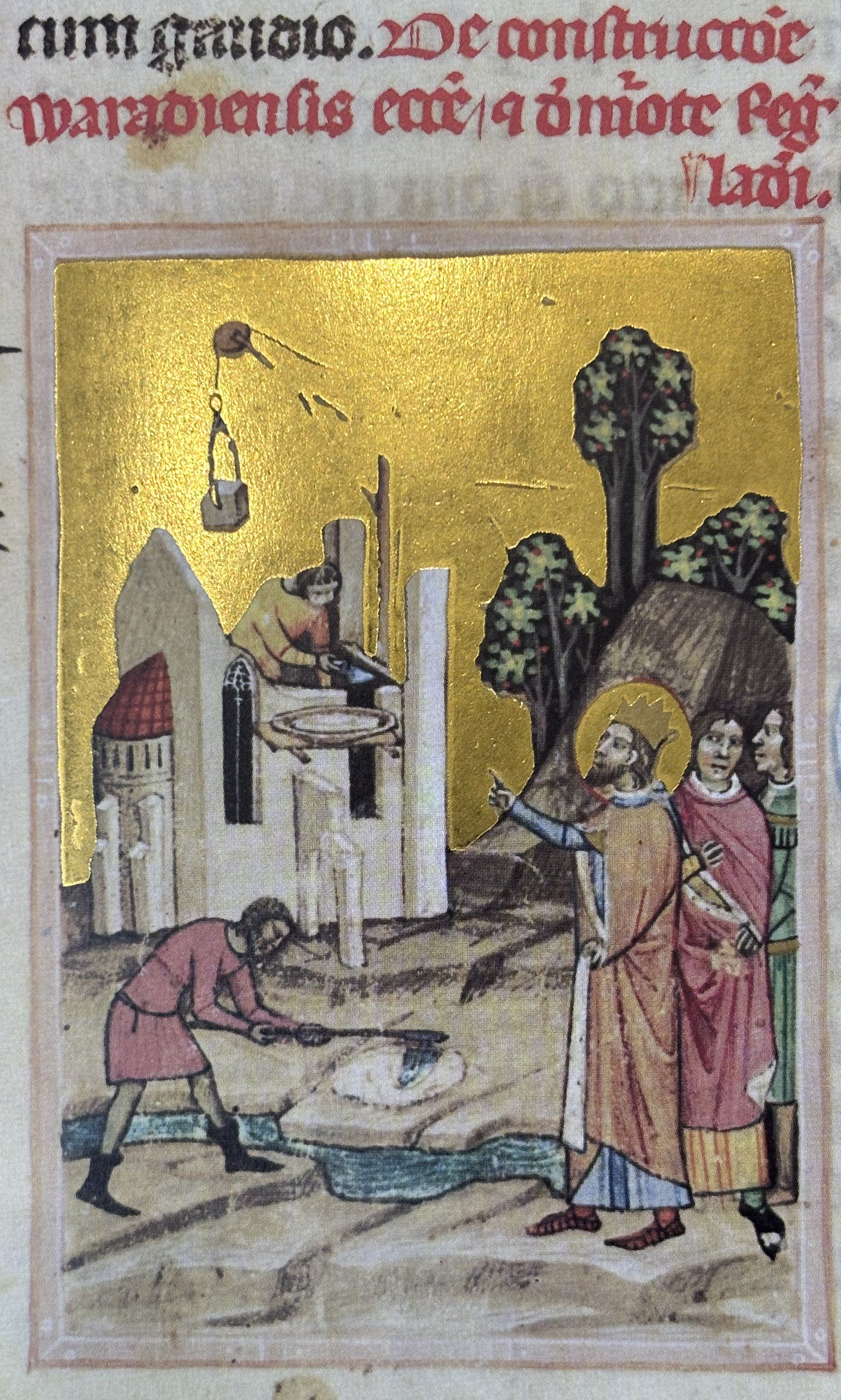
Construction of the church of Várad (now Oradea) by King Saint Ladislaus of Hungary (Chronicon Pictum, 1358)

In the 11th century, King St. Ladislaus I of Hungary established a bishopric settlement near the city of Oradea, the present Roman Catholic Diocese of Oradea.

=== Middle Ages ===
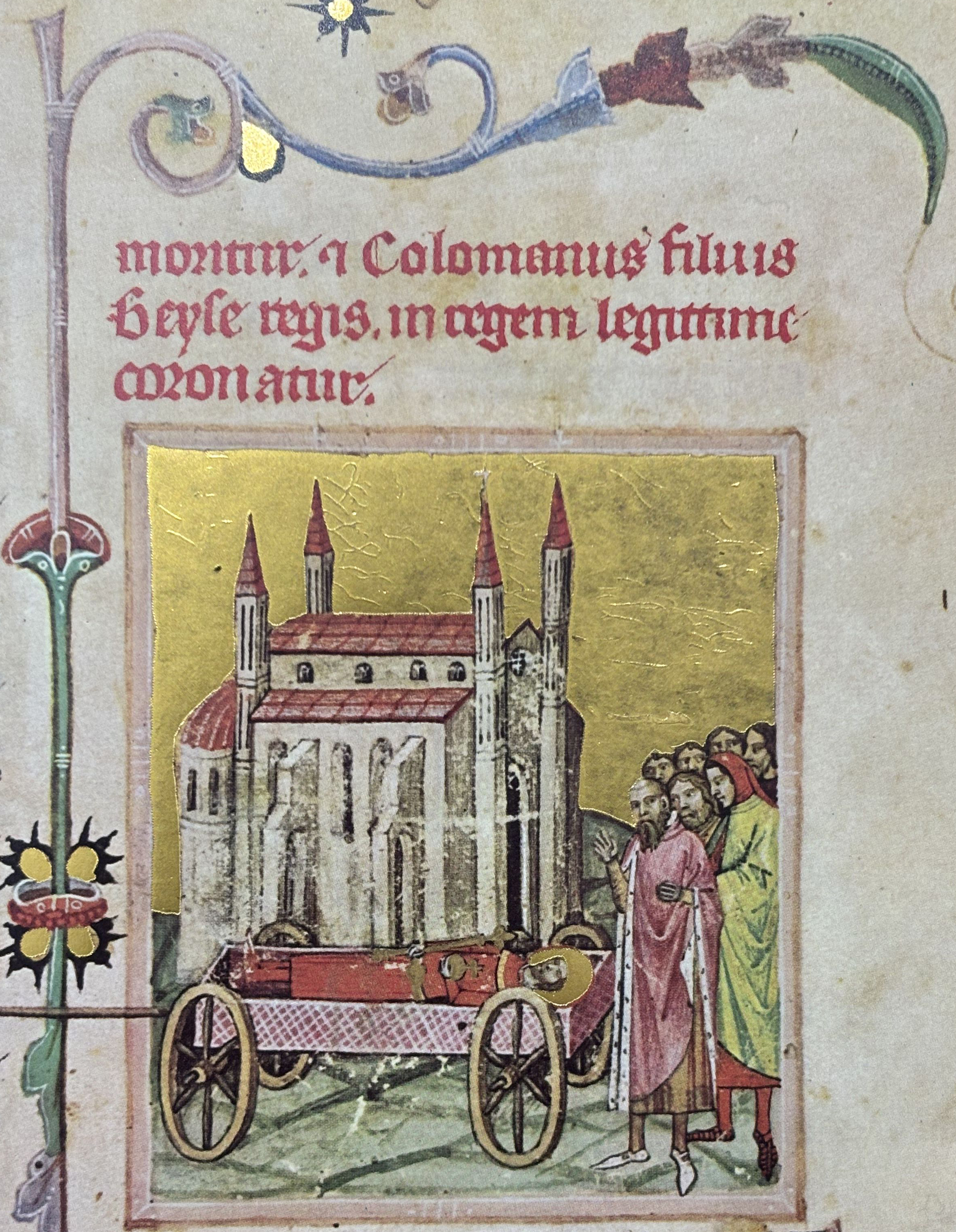
The burial of King Saint Ladislaus of Hungary: the carriage carries the body of the king without horses to the burial place he desired, towards the church of Várad (now Oradea). (Chronicon Pictum, 1358)

The city flourished both economically and culturally during the 13th century as part of the Kingdom of Hungary. An abundance of historical evidence from this time has been found in the Regestrum Varadinense, a record of legal proceedings between 1208 and 1235, from Oradea, containing 711 place names and 2,500 personal names.

The Citadel of Oradea, which was built during the Mongol invasion, was first mentioned in 1241. The fortress would be destroyed and rebuilt several times over the following centuries. The 14th and 15th centuries were the most prosperous periods in the city's history up to that point. Many monuments were erected, including statues of Saints Stephen, Emeric, and Ladislaus (before 1372) and the equestrian sculpture of St. King Ladislaus I (1390). The statue of St. Ladislaus was the first proto-Renaissance public square equestrian monument in Europe. Bishop Andreas Báthori (1329–1345) rebuilt the Cathedral in the Gothic style as well as the Hermes reliquary, now preserved at Győr, containing the skull of St. Ladislaus.

The Tabula Varadiensis of the astronomer Georg von Peuerbach, which was published posthumously in 1464, marked the city's Observatory of Varadinum as the terrestrial point of reference and prime meridian.

=== Turkish Invasions and Conquest ===
In 1474, when the King of Hungary and Croatia, Matthias Corvinus, was absent from the country, Oradea was besieged by the Ottoman Empire's military. As a consequence, the city was severely damaged; however, the king later resettled it with inhabitants from other parts of Hungary, whom he exempted from taxes, a policy retained by Ferdinand I in 1553.

The Peace of Várad was concluded between Emperor Ferdinand I and John Zápolya in Oradea on 4 February 1538, in which they mutually recognized each other as legitimate monarchs. After the Ottoman invasion of Hungary in the 16th century, the city became a constant point of contention among the Principality of Transylvania, the Ottoman Empire, and the Habsburg monarchy. After the 1570 Treaty of Speyer, parts of Crișana, including Oradea, were incorporated into the newly formed Principality of Transylvania, a successor to the Eastern Hungarian Kingdom.

The Ottomans unsuccessfully laid siege to the city in 1598. After the Treaty of Vienna (1606), the city became a permanent part of the Principality of Transylvania by imperial decree.

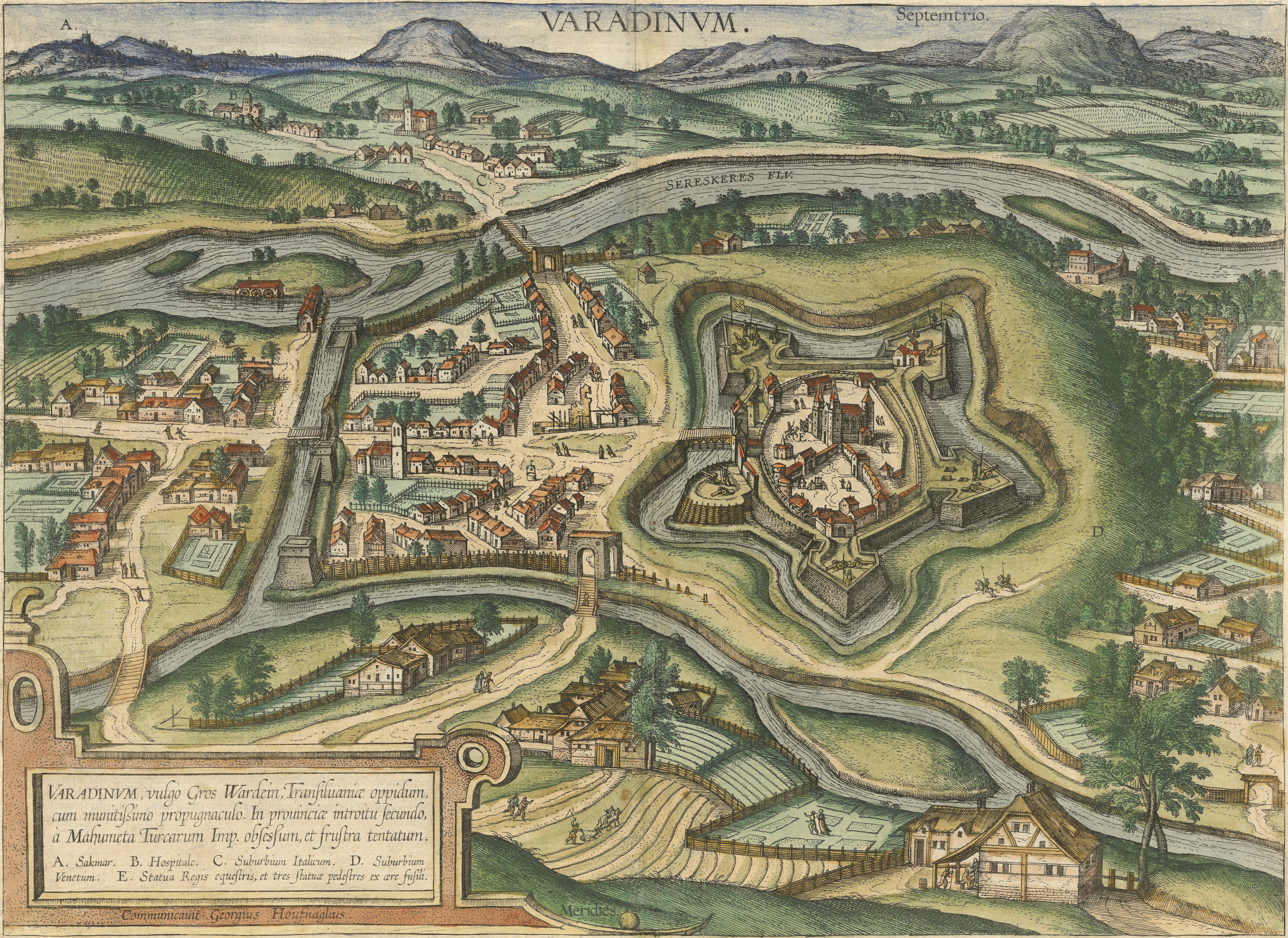
Varadinum (Oradea) in a 1617 engraving by Braun & Hogenberg

After the Transylvanian Prince György Rákoczi II's failed attempt to gain the throne of Poland, the Ottomans again sent an expedition against him and his Wallachian and Moldavian allies: Gheorghe Ștefan and Constantin Șerban. In 1660, an Ottoman force of 45,000 men besieged the city for the last time. The 850 defenders managed to hold out for 46 days, but eventually, the city fell on 27 August 1660 due to internal treachery. The siege is described in detail by János Szalárdi in a contemporaneous chronicle. The Ottomans designated the city as the capital of the newly formed Eyalet of Varat. The eyalet included the sanjaks of Varat (Oradea), Salanta, Debreçin, Halmaş, Sengevi, and Yapışmaz. The Ottoman rule of the city ended in 1692 when Habsburg imperial forces conquered it after a 14-month siege.

=== Habsburg Era ===
The city had been severely damaged during the Great Turkish War, with only 114 houses standing and 21 undamaged. Under the Habsburgs' reconstruction, in the 18th century, Oradea entered its golden age. The Viennese engineer Franz Anton Hillebrandt was tasked with planning the city in the Baroque style. Starting in 1752, many of the city's current landmarks were constructed, such as the Roman Catholic Cathedral, the Moon Church, the State Theatre, and the Baroque Palace.

The city played a major role in the Hungarian Revolution of 1848, being the home of the largest Hungarian arms factory.

=== 20th century ===
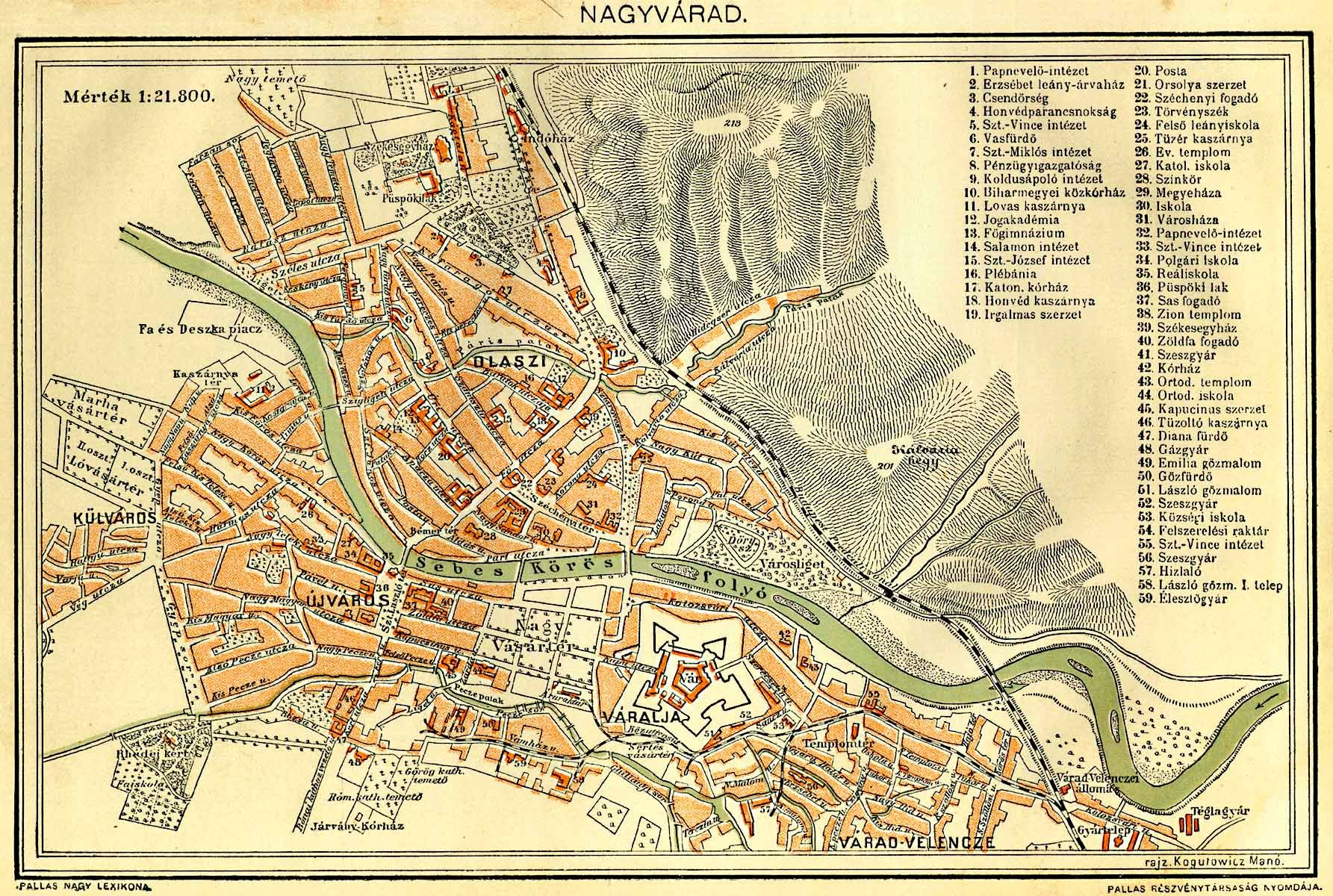
Map of Oradea in 1897

Following the end of World War I and the dissolution of Austria-Hungary, the Hungarian–Romanian War broke out between Hungary and the Kingdom of Romania, with the latter, backed by France, achieving a decisive victory over the Hungarian Soviet Republic, backed by Soviet Russia. Consequently, Oradea passed under Romanian control in 1919 and officially became a part of Romania with the signing of the Treaty of Trianon in 1920. In 1925, the city was designated a municipality, dissolving its former civic autonomy. Under the same ordinance, its name was changed from Oradea Mare (Great Oradea) to simply Oradea.

The Second Vienna Award, brokered by Hitler and Mussolini in 1940, allowed Hungary to recover Northern Transylvania, including Oradea, and mass celebrations welcomed the Hungarian administration. On 12 October 1944, Oradea was captured by Soviet troops of the 2nd Ukrainian Front during the Battle of Debrecen and reverted to Romanian administration in March 1945. After World War II, Hungary relinquished its claims to the city in accordance with the terms of the Treaty of Paris concluded on 10 February 1947.

Due to its history and influential institutions, Oradea is considered one of the most important economic, academic, and cultural centers in Romania, while featuring a unique Romanian-Hungarian bilingual dynamic.

== Demographics ==
According to the 2021 Romanian census, Oradea had a population of 183,105, a decrease from the figures recorded during previous censuses.

Ethnic composition of Oradea (2021)
1. Romanians (77.5%)
2. Hungarians (20.9%)
3. Romani (0.84%)
4. Others (0.77%)
Religious composition of Oradea (2021)
1. Romanian Orthodox (62.2%)
2. Reformed (13.4%)
3. Roman Catholics (8.66%)
4. Pentecostals (5.64%)
5. Baptists (3.78%)
6. Greek Catholics (2.89%)
7. Others (1.71%)
8. Irreligious (1.80%)

Historical population of Oradea
Year	Population	%±	Romanian	Hungarian
1787	9,790	—	n/a	n/a
1830	19,091	95%	n/a	n/a
1857	22,443	17.5%	n/a	n/a
1880	31,324	39.5%	6.5%	86.8%
1900	47,018	50.1%	n/a	n/a
1910 census	64,169	36.4%	5.6%	91.0%
1930 census	82,687	28.8%	27.1%	51.5%
1948 census	82,282	−0.4%	32.8%	63.8%
1956 census	98,950	20.2%	35.9%	59.0%
1966 census	122,534	23.8%	46.0%	51.3%
1977 census	170,531	39.1%	53.9%	44.0%
1992 census	222,741	30.6%	64.7%	33.3%
2002 census	206,614	−7.2%	70.3%	27.5%
2011 census	196,367	−4.9%	73.1%	24.9%
2021 census	183,105	−6.8%	77.5%	20.9%

=== Jewish community ===
This section incorporates text from the 1901–1906 Jewish Encyclopedia, a publication now in the public domain.

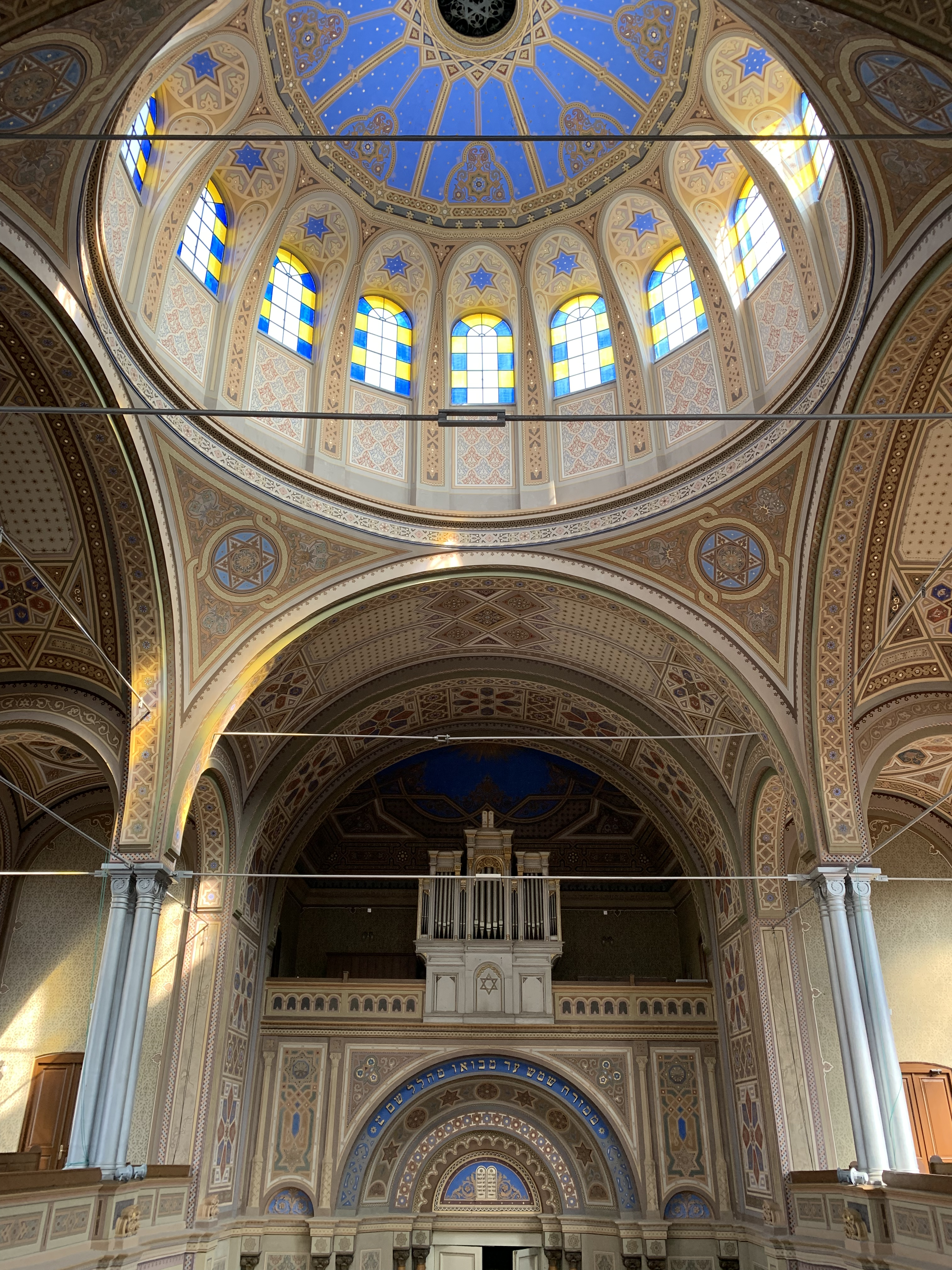
Interior of the Neolog Synagogue

The chevra kadisha ("holy society") was founded in 1735, the first synagogue in 1803, and the first communal school in 1839. Not until the beginning of the 19th century were Jews permitted to do business in any other part of the city, and even then, they were required to return at nightfall to their own quarter. In 1835, permission was granted for Jews to live in any part of the city.

The Jewish community of Oradea became divided into Orthodox and Neolog congregations. While the members of the Neolog congregation still retained their membership in the chevra kadisha, they began to use a cemetery of their own in 1899. In the early 20th century, the Jews of Oradea had achieved prominence in public life in the city. Furthermore, there were Jewish manufacturers, merchants, lawyers, physicians, and farmers; in 1902, the chief of police was a Jew; and in the municipal council, the Jewish element was proportionately represented. The community possessed, in addition to the hospital and chevra kadisha, a Jewish women's association, a grammar school, a trade school for boys and girls, a yeshiva, a soup kitchen, etc.

According to the Center for Jewish Art:

The Oradea Jewish community was once the most active both commercially and culturally in the Austro-Hungarian Empire. In 1944, twenty-five thousand Oradean Jews were deported to concentration camps by the Nazis, thus decimating this vital community. Only three hundred Jews reside in Oradea today. In the center of the city, on the riverbank and towering over other buildings in the area, is the large Neolog Temple Synagogue, built in 1878. The unusual cube-shaped synagogue with its large cupola is one of the largest in Romania. Inside, there is a large organ and stucco decorations. In 1891, the Orthodox community also built a complex of buildings, including two synagogues and a community center.

In 1944, during the occupation of Hungary by Nazi Germany, Hungarian authorities forced the Jewish inhabitants into the Oradea ghetto before sending them to the Auschwitz concentration camp. Descendants of the pre-Holocaust Hasidic rabbinate in Oradea established a synagogue in the Willowbrook area of Staten Island, New York City. The synagogue maintains both a traditional Hasidic Nusach Sefard and a Nusach Ashkenaz service, the latter of which operates under the name Bais Medrash Igud Avreichim of Groisverdain (the Yiddish pronunciation of Grosswardein).

As of 2021, there is a project to build a rabbinical seminary in Oradea.

== Politics and administration ==
The city government is headed by a mayor. Since 2020, the office has been held by Florin Birta. Decisions are approved and discussed by the local government (consiliu local) made up of 27 elected councilors.

Party	Seats	Current Local Council
National Liberal Party (PNL)	20	
Democratic Alliance of Hungarians (UDMR/RMDSZ)	4	
Social Democratic Party (PSD)	3	

== Quarters ==
Map of the current 30 districts

Before 1848, Oradea was made up of four separate towns: Várad-Újváros (Villa Nova, formerly Vicus Szombathely), Várad-Olaszi (Villa Latinorum Varadiensium, "olasz" meaning Italian), Várad-Velence (Vicus Venetia), and Várad-Váralja (Civitas Waradiensis). The names Vicus Venetia, Villa Latinorum, Vicus Bolognia, Vicus Padua, and others refer to the French, Walloons, and Italian inhabitants who settled in the 13th century.

Today, the city is made up of the following districts, called quarters (cartiere in Romanian, negyedek in Hungarian):

- Calea Aradului
- Calea Sântandrei
- Orașul nou (city centre)
- Dacia – Decebal
- Dimitrie Cantemir
- Dragoș Vodă
- Dorobanților
- Eastern Industrial Zone
- Episcopia Bihor
- Europa
- Gheorghe Doja
- Ioșia
- Ioșia Nord
- Ioșia Sud
- Mihai Eminescu
- Nicolae Grigorescu
- Nicolae Iorga
- Nufărul
- Olosig
- Oncea
- Podgoria
- Rogerius
- Salca
- Seleuș
- Splaiul Crișanei
- Subcetate
- Tokai
- Tineretului
- Universității
- Velența
- Vie, also known as Podgoria
- Western Industrial Zone

== Economy ==
Oradea has been seen as a prosperous city in Romania. The per capita GDP of Oradea is approximately 150% of the national average of Romania. After 1989, due to its base of consumers, Oradea experienced economic renewal, primarily in the services sector, such as trade and tourism.

Oradea has an unemployment rate of 6.0%, slightly lower than the Romanian average but significantly higher than Bihor County's average of approximately 2%. Oradea produces around 63% of the industrial production of Bihor County while accounting for 34.5% of the county's population. Its main industries are furniture, textiles, clothing, footwear, and food processing. Oradea's economy is sustained largely by small and medium businesses and the property taxes paid by citizens.

In the fiscal year 2012, Oradea had the largest budget in the Transylvania region, overcoming its neighboring cities, Arad and Cluj-Napoca. Several large Romanian companies, including Adeplast, RCS-RDS, European Drinks, and FrigoExpress, are located in Oradea.

As of 2021, Oradea was using geothermal electricity from water two kilometers below ground, which provided 7% of the energy for its district heating system. That system served 70% of the city's population with heat and hot water.

== Transport ==
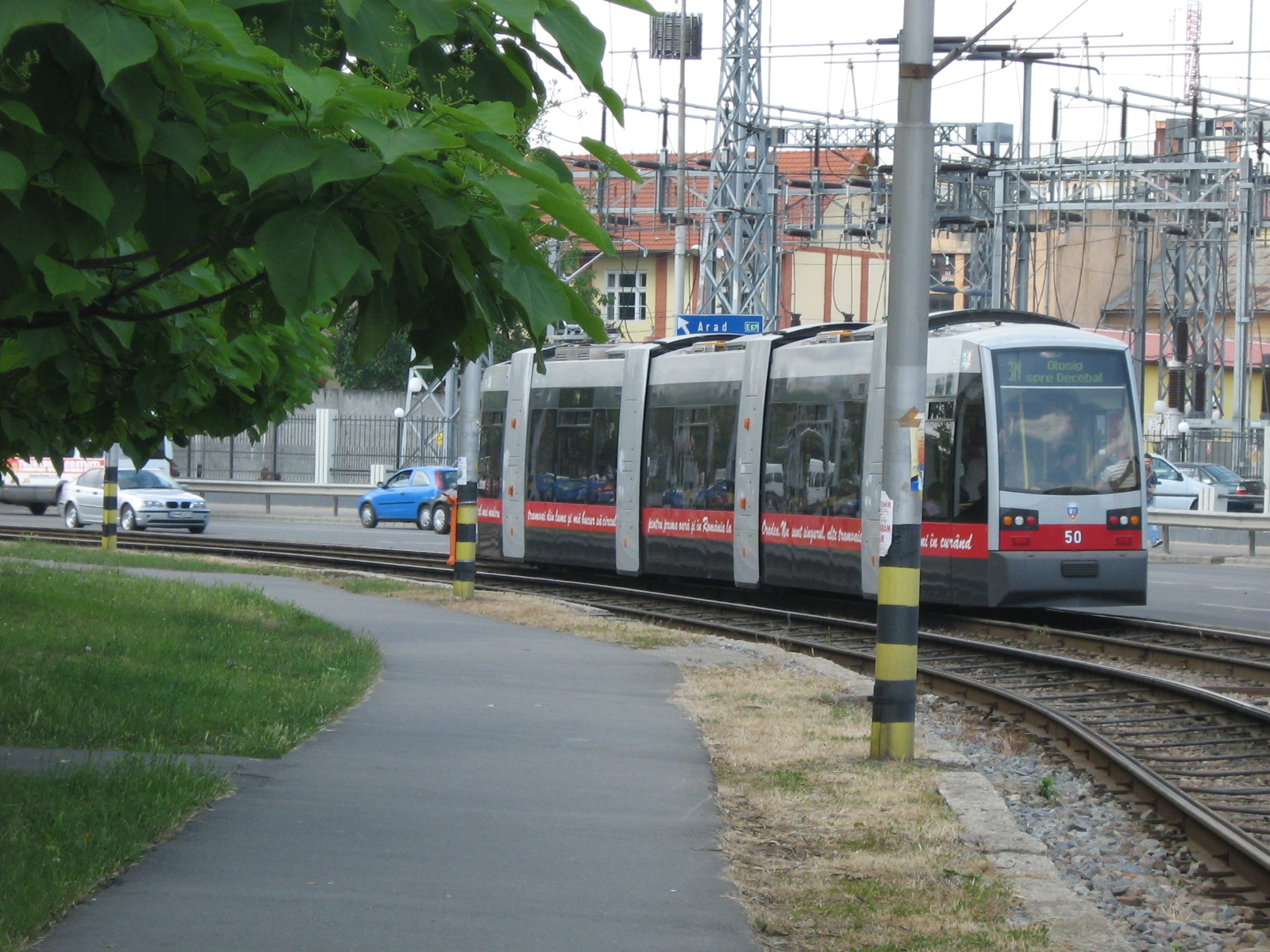
Oradea Ultra Low Floor tram

The public transport network in Oradea is operated by OTL (Oradea Transport Local), a municipal agency. It includes eight tram lines (numbered from 1-8) 17 local bus routes (numbered from 10 to 26), and one international suburban bus line to Biharkeresztes, Hungary. The metropolitan area is also served by regional buses connecting Oradea to nearby localities such as Băile Felix, Băile 1 Mai, Borș, and Sânmartin.

The city has four train stations: Oradea Central Station (commonly known as “Oradea”), West Station (located in the Ioșia district), East Station (in the Velența neighborhood), and Episcopia Bihor Station, near the Hungarian border, which serves international rail traffic.

Oradea International Airport reopened in late 2015 following runway renovations. It offers both domestic and international flights. The airport is connected to the city center via OTL bus line 28, as well as taxi and ride-hailing services. The airport was modernized further in the 2020s which introduced a new terminal, longer runway and more flight destinations (Warsaw Chopin, Munich, Milan Bergamo, London Stansted, Rome Fiumicino, Dortmund and more charter flights).

Additional modes of transport in Oradea include:

- Taxi and ride-hailing services: Uber and Bolt operate in the city, offering ride options for various budgets and comfort levels. These services are also available for airport transfers.
- Bike and e-scooter sharing: Bolt and Uber occasionally offer shared bicycles and electric scooters. The city has more than 70 kilometers of dedicated bike lanes, including a cross-border cycling route to Hungary.
- Car sharing and vehicle rental: Bolt Drive allows users to rent cars by the hour or by the day directly from the app. Traditional car rental services are also available through local providers such as FlexiRent.

== Education ==
The city is home to the University of Oradea, one of the largest universities in Romania. There are also several private universities, one being Agora University, founded in 2000. Emanuel University, an accredited private Baptist university, has also been established in the city since 1998. The Partium Christian University was established in 1995 and teaches in Hungarian.

As of 2012, there had been 232 years since the inauguration of higher education in Oradea and 48 years of continuous higher education. A higher institution for philosophic teaching was founded in Oradea in 1780, which became the Faculty of Law in 1788, the oldest faculty within a region of Eastern Europe.

After 1921, all courses at the Faculty of Law were taught in Romanian. In 1923, two theological academies were founded in Oradea. The Law Academy of Oradea, together with the two theological academies, was to make another step forward by integrating a faculty of letters, thus achieving the old desire of creating a University of Crișana in Oradea.

After a thirty-year break in the activity of the Law Academy of Oradea, on 1 October 1963, an order of the Ministry of Education established a 3-year Pedagogic Institute meant to address the scarcity of teachers in secondary education. The new institution of higher education began its activities with two faculties: Philology and Mathematics-Physics. A year later, two additional faculties, History-Geography and Physical Education, were added.

In May 1990, a decree of the Romanian Government established the Technical University of Oradea, later called the University of Oradea. The University of Oradea is an integrated institution of higher education, comprising 18 faculties.

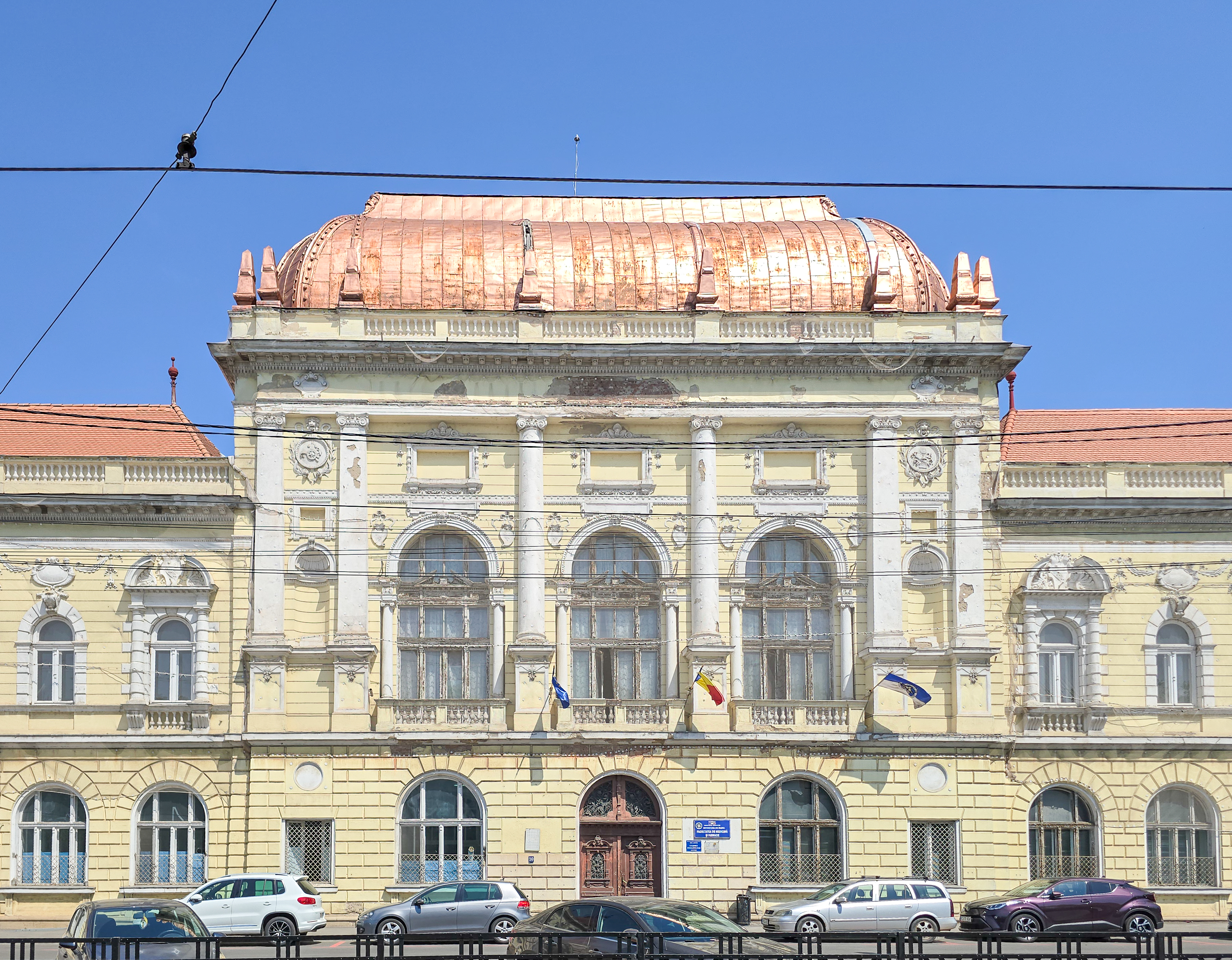
Faculty of Medicine and Pharmacy (University of Oradea)

The structure of the university contains academic education, postgraduate education, and scientific research.

Research within the University of Oradea is developing in natural and physical sciences, as well as in the area of social and human sciences, covering Mathematics, Physics, Chemistry, Life Sciences, Agricultural Sciences, Medical Sciences, Technological Sciences, Economical Sciences, Geography, History, Juridical Sciences and Law, Linguistics, Pedagogy, Political Sciences, Psychology, Letters and Arts, Sociology, and Philosophy.

The Sulyok István Reform College was founded in the spring of 1990 by the Királyhágómelléki Reform Church. In 1999, the school became entirely independent from the Protestant Theology College of Cluj-Napoca and changed its name to Partium Christian University. It presently operates with 12 faculties and a student body of 1400 and is taught in Hungarian.

In the 2020s Oradea has seen an acceleration of development in the educational field, including the modernization and construction of daycares, kindergartens and primary/middle/high schools as well as the introduction of Romania's first dual-teaching school and the building of housing for university students.

== Architecture ==
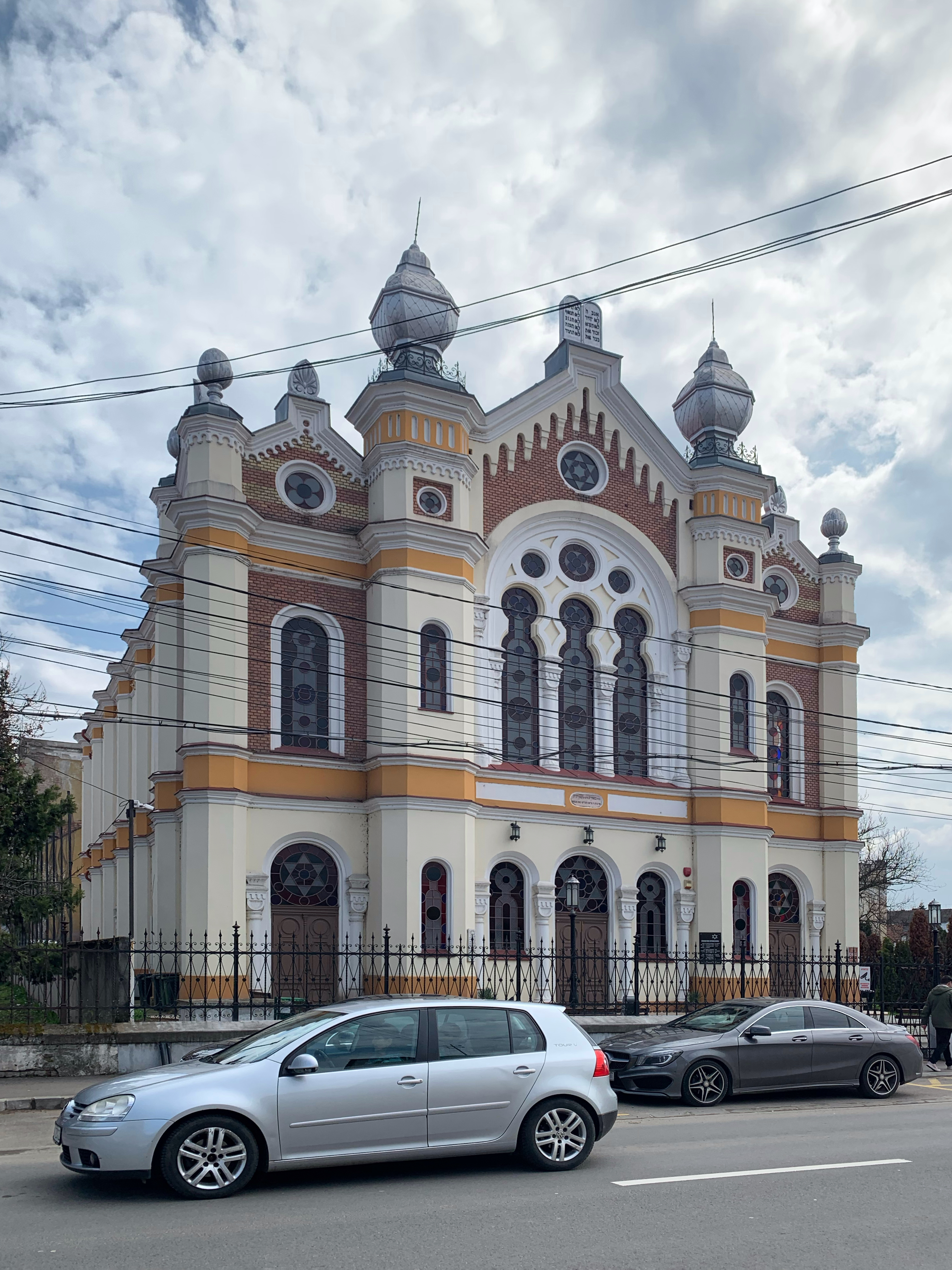
Orthodox Synagogue

Oradea contains both Communist-era apartment buildings, mainly in the outer quarters, and historical buildings built when the city was part of Austria-Hungary. In addition to many Baroque buildings, Oradea has a collection of Art Nouveau architecture.

Located on Romania's western border, Nagyvárad (renamed Oradea after the Treaty of Trianon) was part of the Hungarian Kingdom until 1921, which was also part of the Central European Austro-Hungarian Empire and thus influenced by the artistic currents of Central Europe.

The buildings of the early 20th century are influenced by Lechner and Vienna Secession styles. These include rental buildings, (Moskovits Palace I and II, Apollo Palace, Stern Palace, Adorján Houses I and II, Darvasy Palace), villas (La Roche, Vágó, Okany Schwartz), hotels (Pannonia, Emke, Rimonoczy, Weiszlovics, Fekete Sas / Vulturul Negru), military buildings – on Armatei Române Street, industrial buildings and warehouses (beer-, spirit-, bricks-factories, electric plant's chimney), public institutions (City Hall, Palace of Orthodox Bishopry, Palace of Greek-Catholic Bishopry, Palace of Justice, banks, houses of commerce and industry etc.), signed by architects including Odon Lechner, Dezső Jakab, Marcell Komor, László and József Vágó, Valér Mende, Ferenc Sztaril, Ferenc Löbl, Kálmán Rimanóczy Sr.and Jr., Anton Szallerbek.

The city also developed industrial buildings and warehouses—such as beer, spirit, and brick factories, and the former electric plant chimney—alongside public institutions including the City Hall, the Palace of the Orthodox Bishopric, the Palace of the Greek-Catholic Bishopric, the Palace of Justice, and various bank and commercial buildings.

== Tourist attractions ==
The old city centre is one of the main tourist attractions in Oradea, as are the Băile Felix health spas, accessible by bus and located just outside the city.

Other sites that attract tourists include:

- Baroque Palace of Oradea – today Muzeul Țării Crișurilor. It was the Roman Catholic bishop's palace until 1945, when the Communist regime took the building into public ownership. It was returned to the Roman Catholic Church in 2003. Its collection includes many fossils of dinosaurs and birds from the bauxite mines at Cornet-Brusturi.
- Roman Catholic Basilica-Cathedral of the Assumption of Mary, or simply "Baroque Cathedral" ("Catedrala barocă") – the largest Baroque cathedral in Romania, and home to a skull relic and 2 statutes of St. King Ladislaus I of Hungary.
- Cetatea Oradea – Oradea's Fortress, with a pentagonal shape, is a fortification with walls of rock on some portions and wood towers situated at the gate and at the corners.
- Biserica cu Lună – a church with an astronomical clock depicting the phases of the moon, a unique feature in Europe.
- Pasajul Vulturul Negru – the "Black Eagle Palace" (or "Eagle Palace") shopping galleria, named after its stained glass eagle in the ceiling.
- Ady Endre Museum – a museum dedicated to notable Hungarian poet Endre Ady, a former resident of Oradea.
- Teatrul de Stat Oradea – the Oradea State Theatre (also known as the Queen Mary Theatre, or Teatrul Regina Maria) on Ferdinand Square in the heart of the city, completed in 1900.
- Strada Republicii – considered by some to be one of the most decorative streets of Transylvania, it displays a great number of Art Nouveau buildings.
- Some 100 religious sites of different denominations in Oradea, including three synagogues (only one still in use) and the largest Baptist church in Eastern Europe, Emmanuel Baptist Church.

== Sports ==
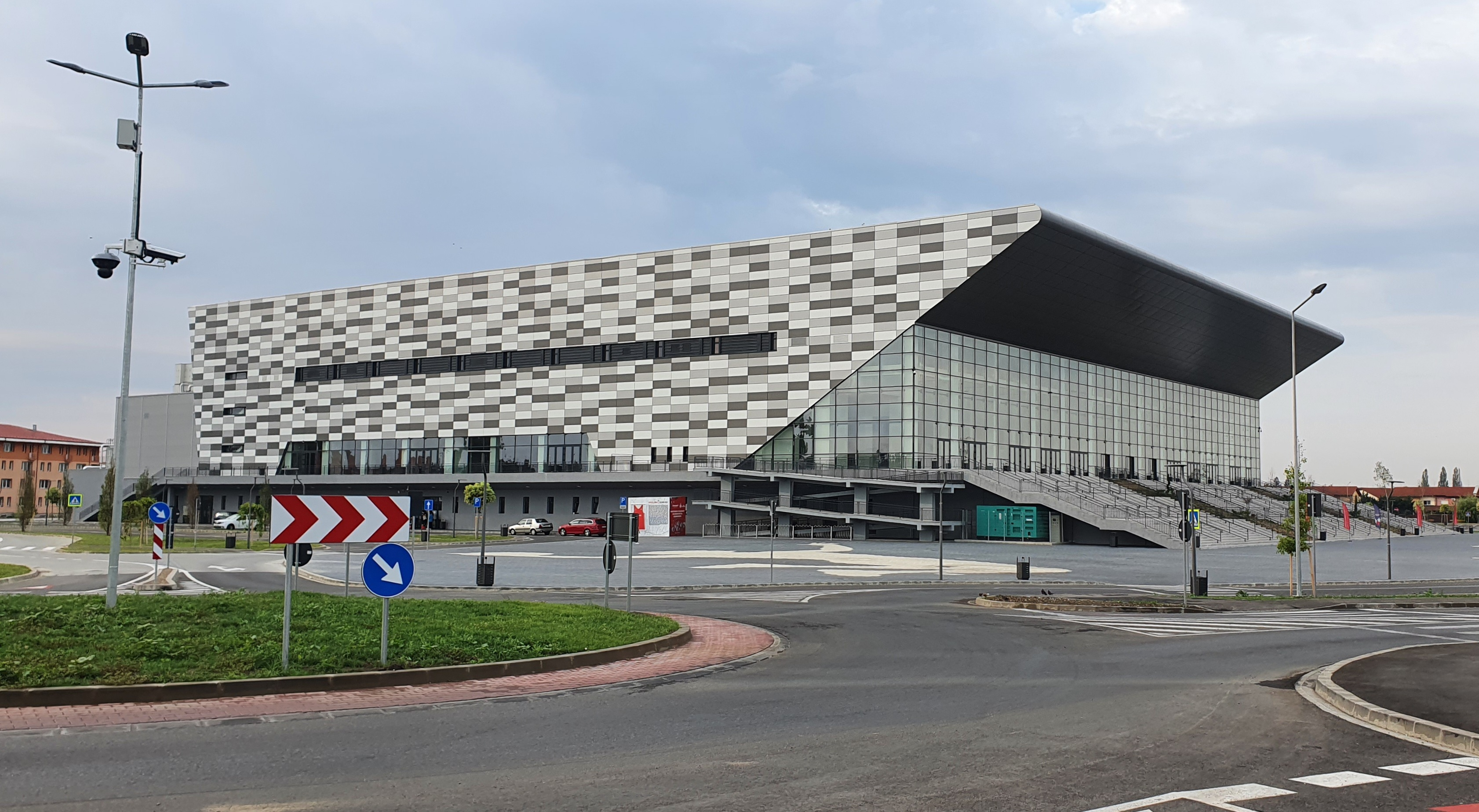
Oradea Arena

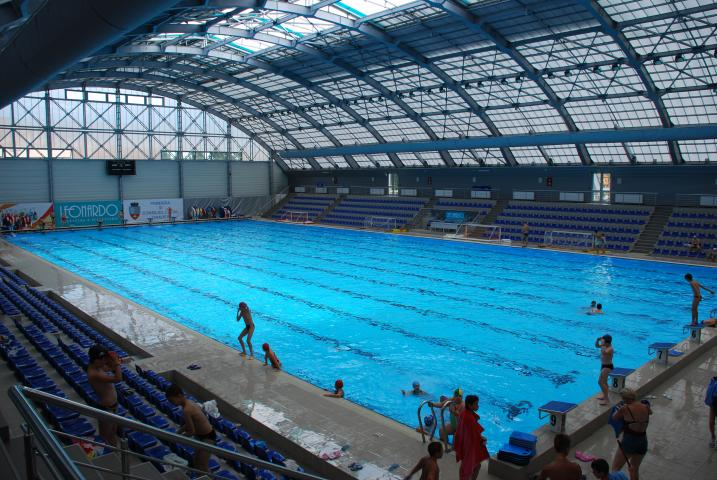
Ioan Alexandrescu Olympic Pool

CSM Oradea, Oradea's professional basketball club, plays in the country's 1st division, Liga Națională, a competition that the club won in 2016 and 2018. They have also competed in international competitions such as Champions League. The team plays its home matches at the Arena Antonio Alexe.

FC Bihor, founded in 1958, with club colors red and blue, featured a logo displaying the year 1902, marking the first football match played in Oradea in Réday Park. It was the city's most prominent football club for 58 years until it was dissolved in 2016, due to significant financial difficulties. A new club appeared in 2022, under the same name FC Bihor Oradea.

CA Oradea (CAO), founded in 1910, became famous after the annexation of Northern Transylvania by Hungary during WWII. The football club played in the Hungarian Championship under the Hungarian translation Nagyváradi Atlétikai Club (NAC), and won the championship at the end of the 1943–1944 season. CA Oradea is one of only three football clubs who played and won national championships in three countries (the other two are SK Rapid Wien and Derry City). After FC Bihor's dissolution, CAO was refounded in the spring of 2017, 54 years after its dissolution. In the late years another club appeared on the city's football stage, Luceafărul Oradea, club that was founded in 2001 and now is playing in the Liga II, being the most representative football club of the city and Bihor County, at this moment.

Many notable footballers were born in Oradea over time, such as: Iuliu Baratky, Cosmin Bărcăuan, Elemér Berkessy, Zeno Bundea, Zoltan Crișan, Claudiu Keșerü, Attila Kun, Erik Lincar, Marius Popa, Paul Popovici, Francisc Spielmann, Albert Ströck, and Ion Zare.

CSM Digi Oradea is Oradea's professional water polo club, it evolves in the Romanian Superliga, competition that it won 9 times in a row and also have a regular presence in LEN Champions League or LEN Euro Cup, being a finalist in the last one.

== Twin Cities ==
Oradea is twinned with:

- Ceyrat, France
- Coslada, Spain
- Debrecen, Hungary
- Givatayim, Israel
- Linköping, Sweden
- Mantua, Italy
- Băcioi, Moldova

== Metropolitan area ==
Oradea metropolitan area is a metropolitan area located in Western Romania, in the County of Bihor, Crişana Romania and was founded on 9 May 2005. The metropolitan area comprises the city of Oradea and 8 adjacent communes:

- Biharia
- Borş
- Cetariu
- Nojorid
- Oşorhei
- Paleu
- Sânmartin
- Sântandrei

== Gallery ==
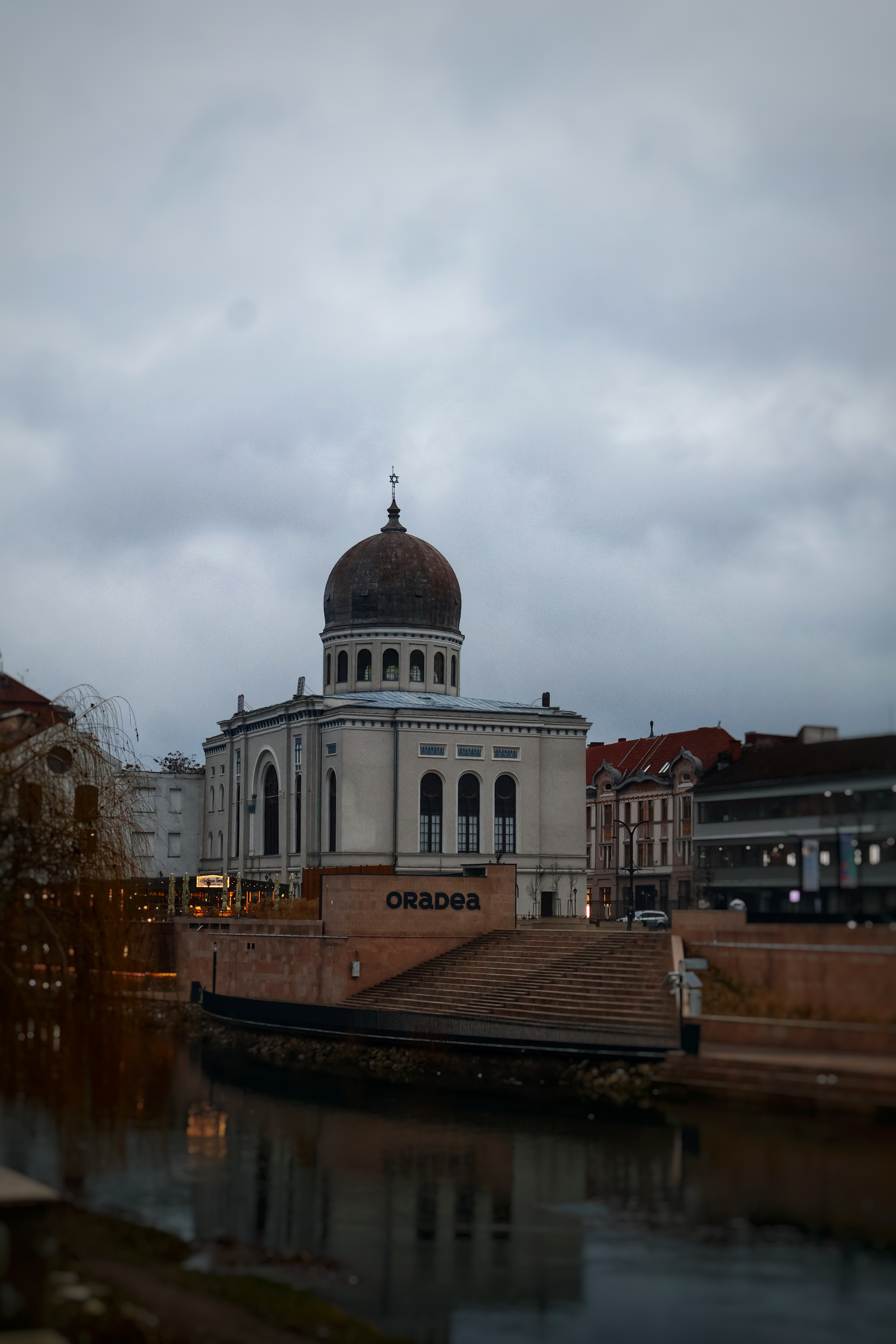
The Sion Sinagouge near the Crisul Repede River

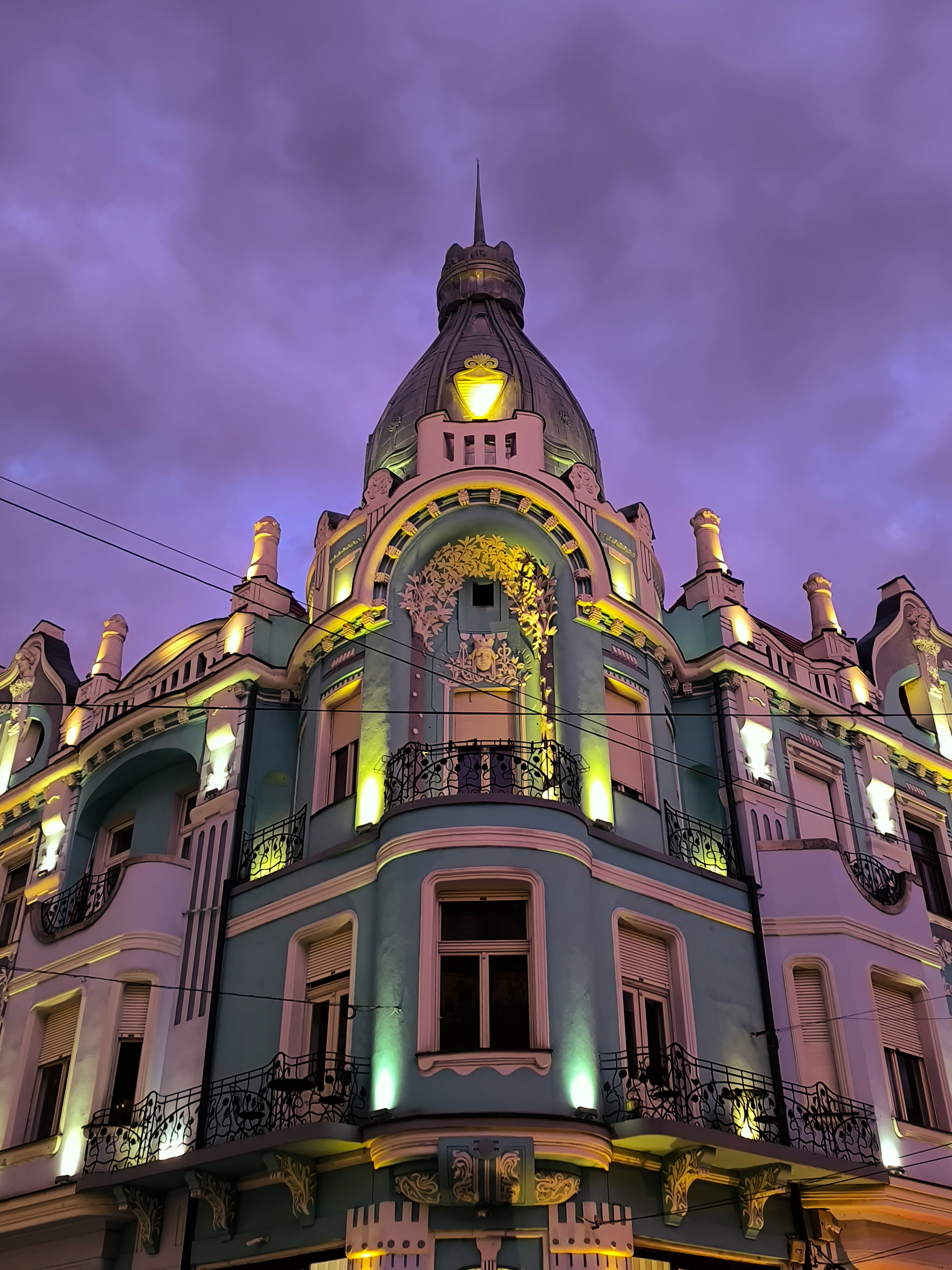
Moskovits Miksa Palace at night

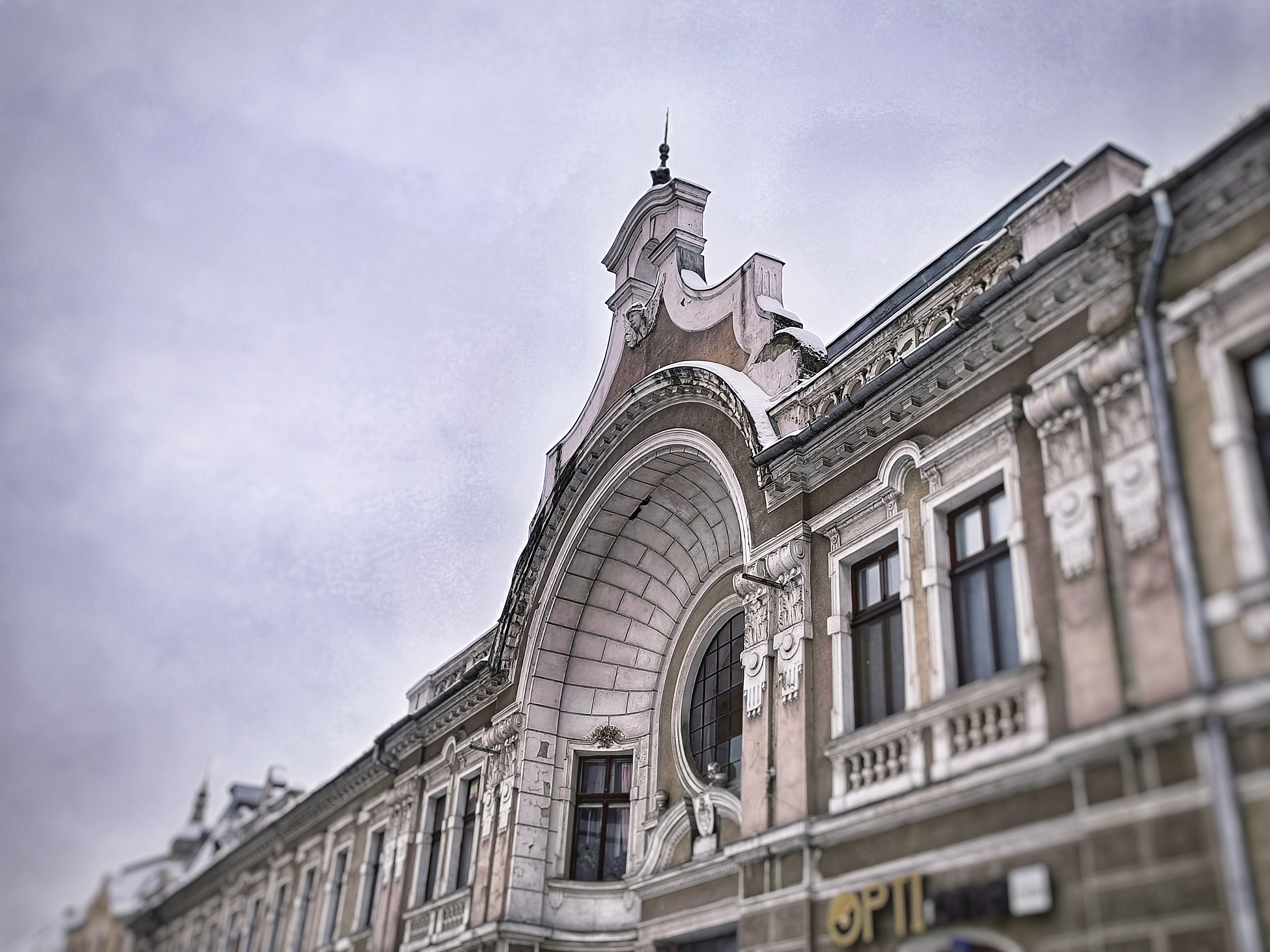
Bazaar

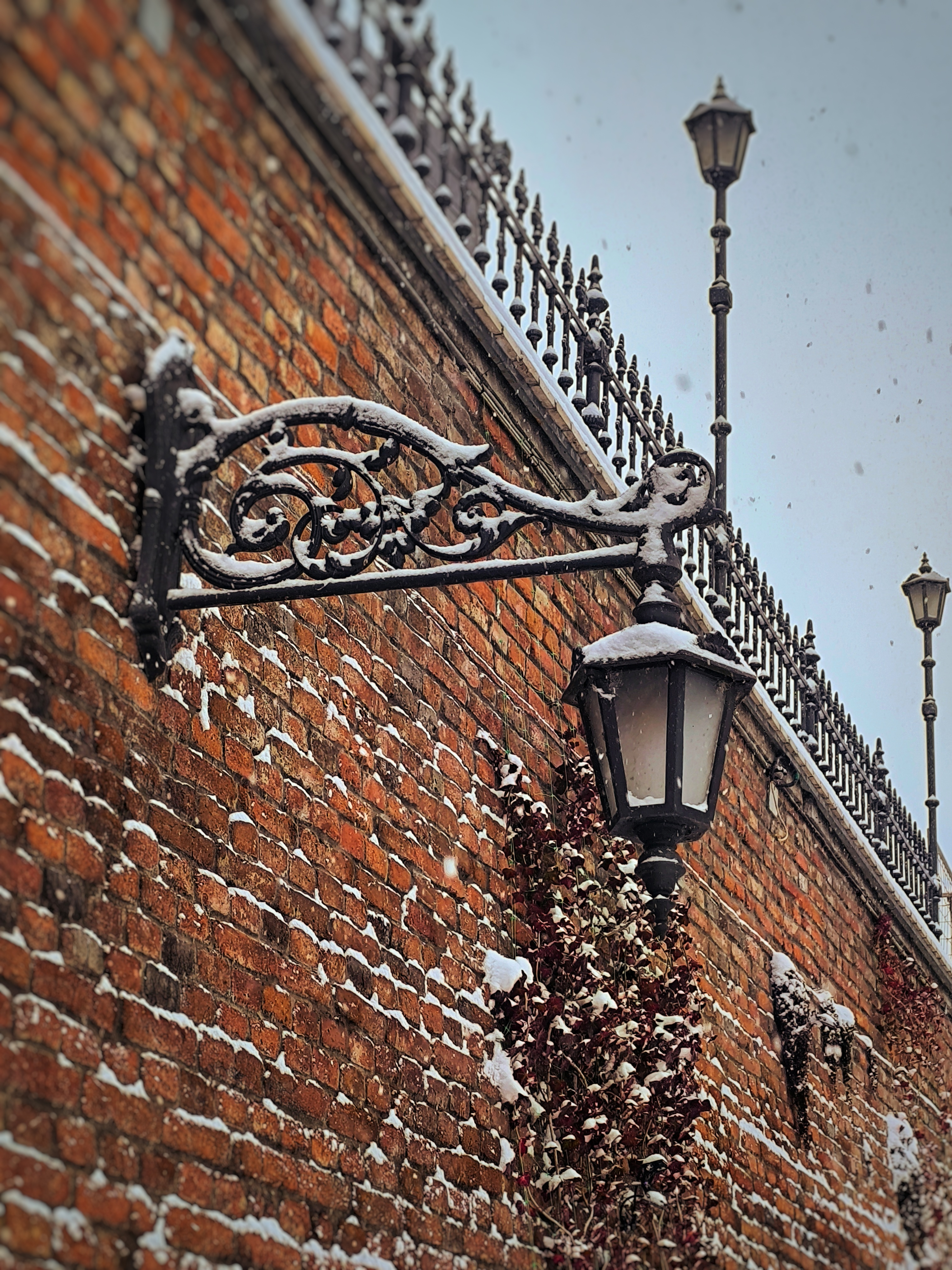
Old city lamp near the river

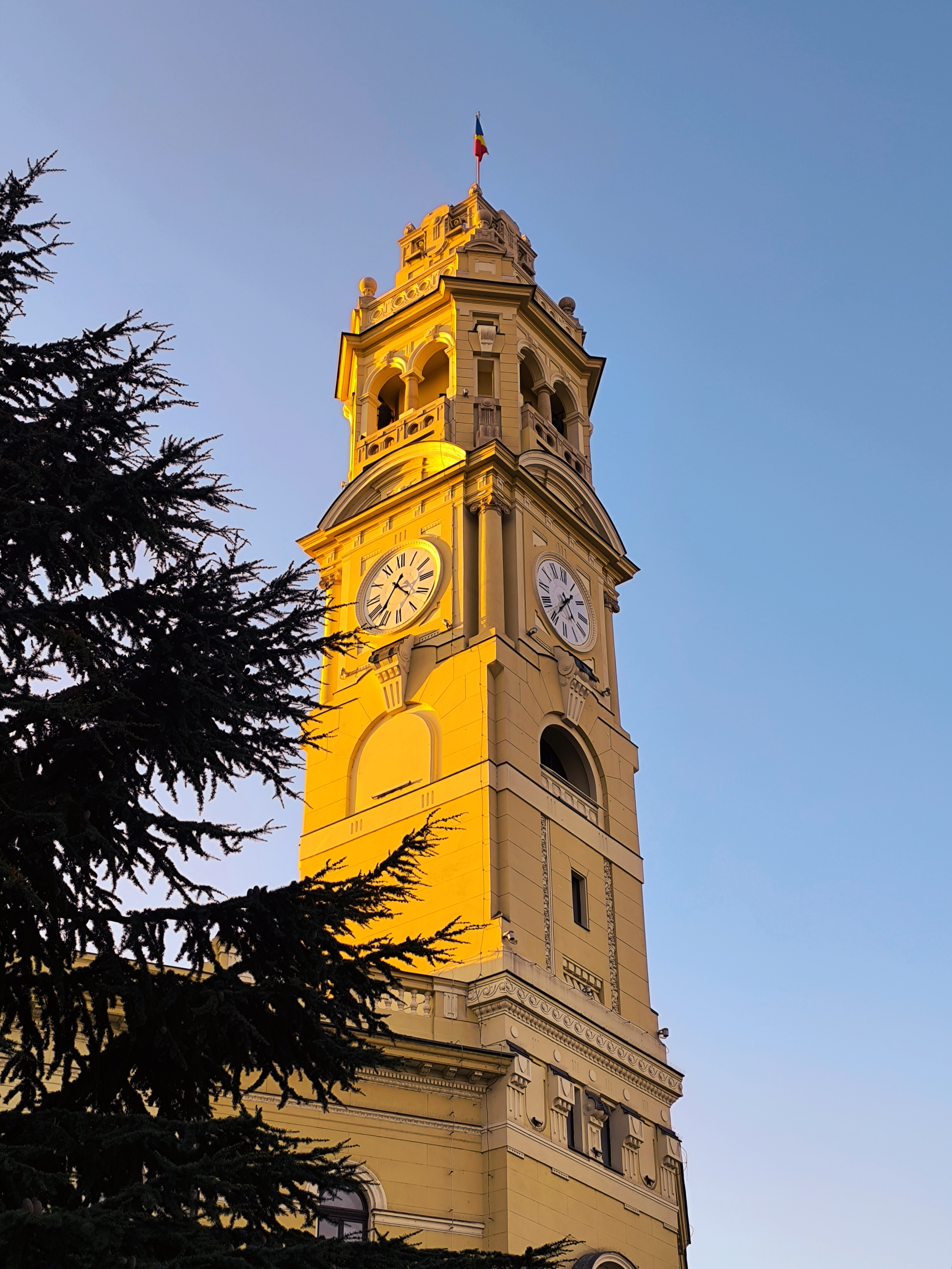
The Tower of the city hall

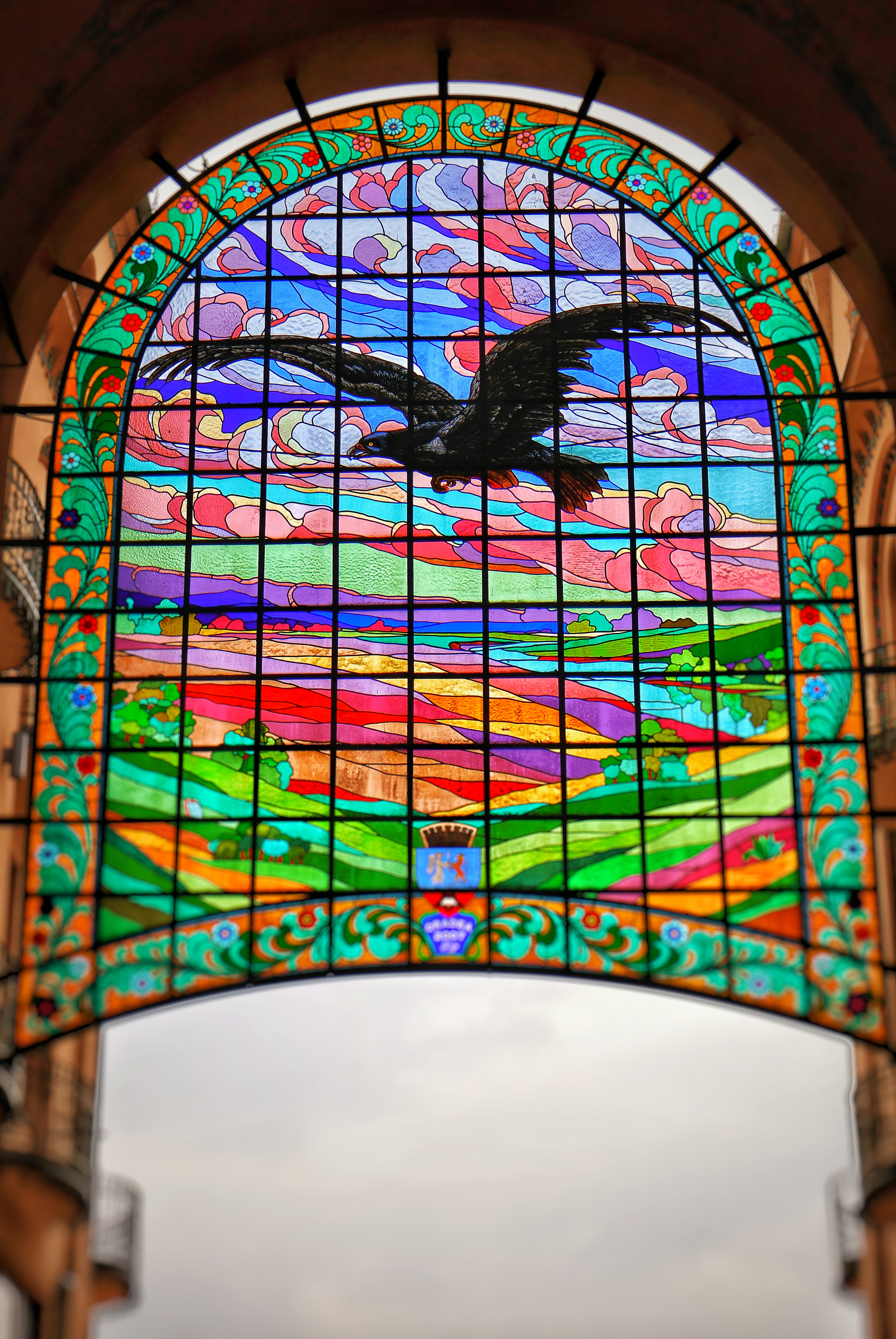
The Black Eagle

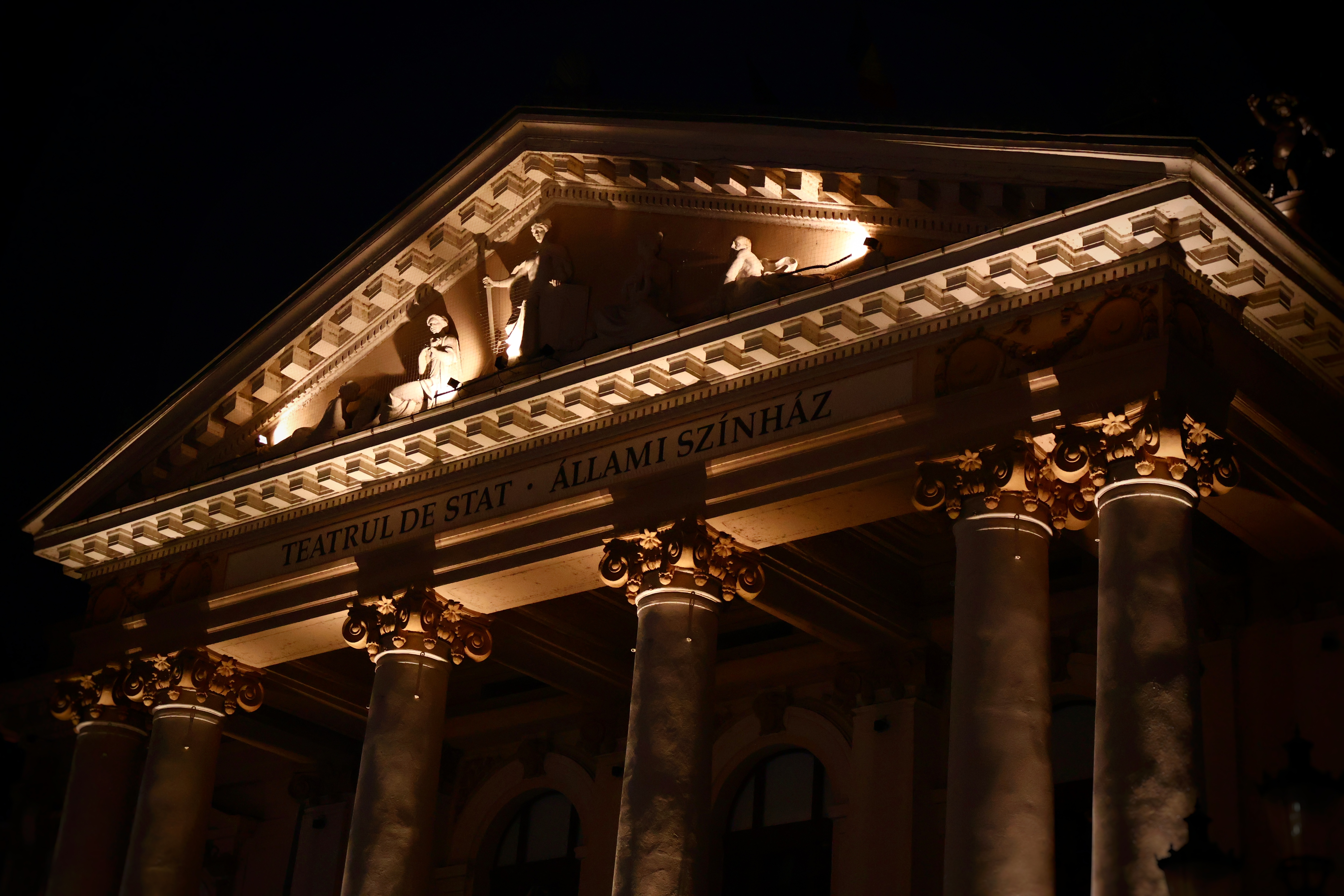
Theatre

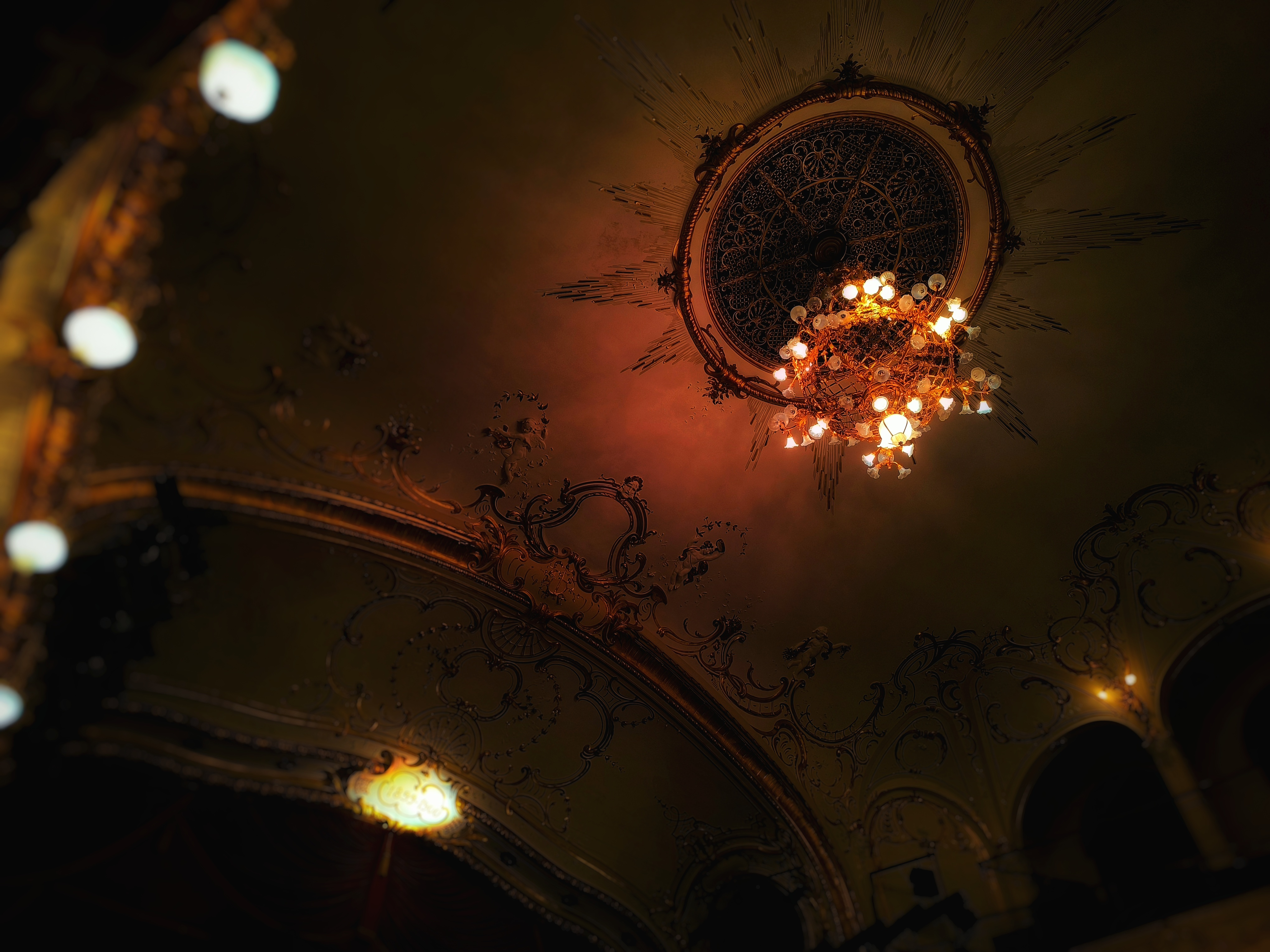
Inside The Theatre

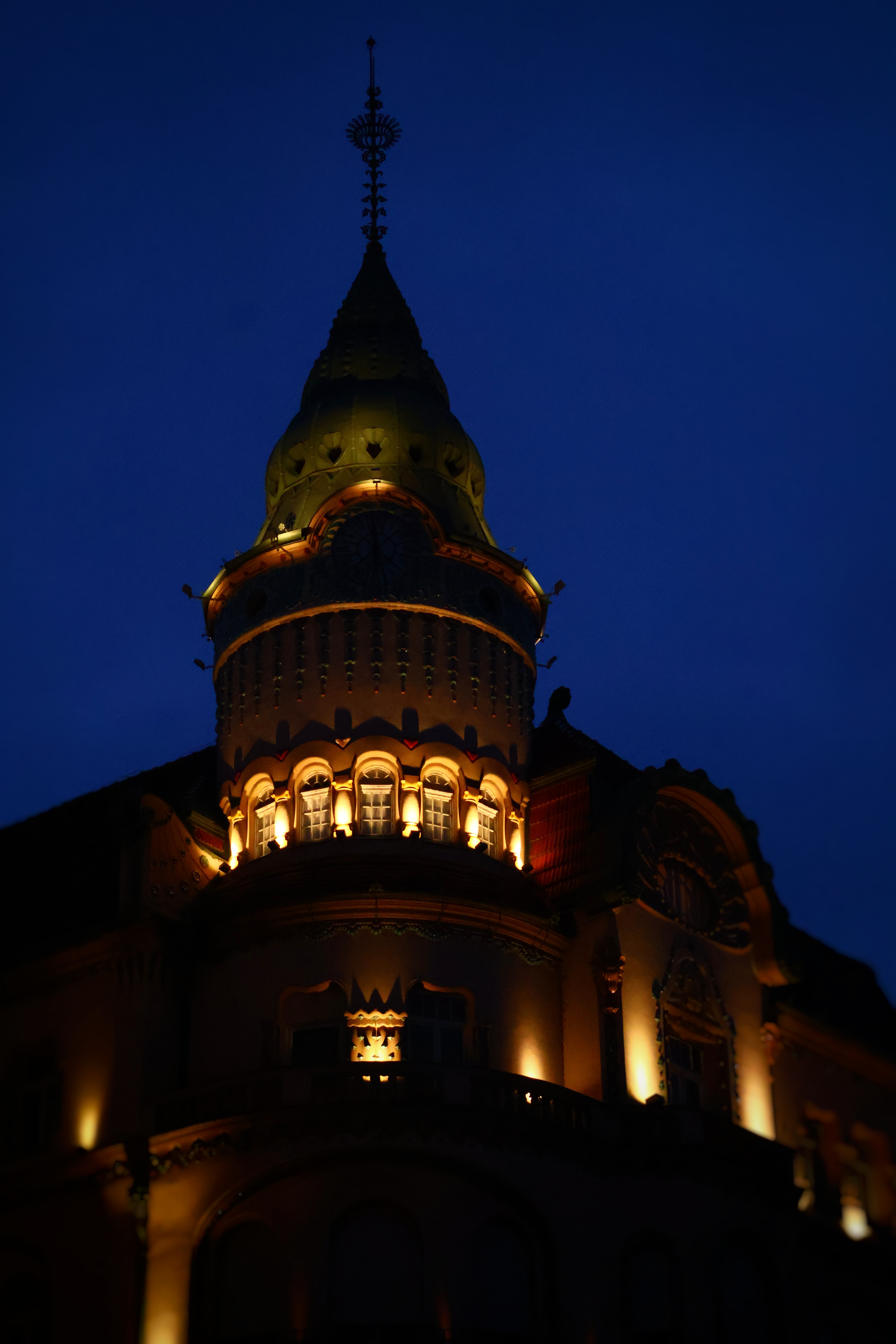
Tower of the Black Eagle Palace at night

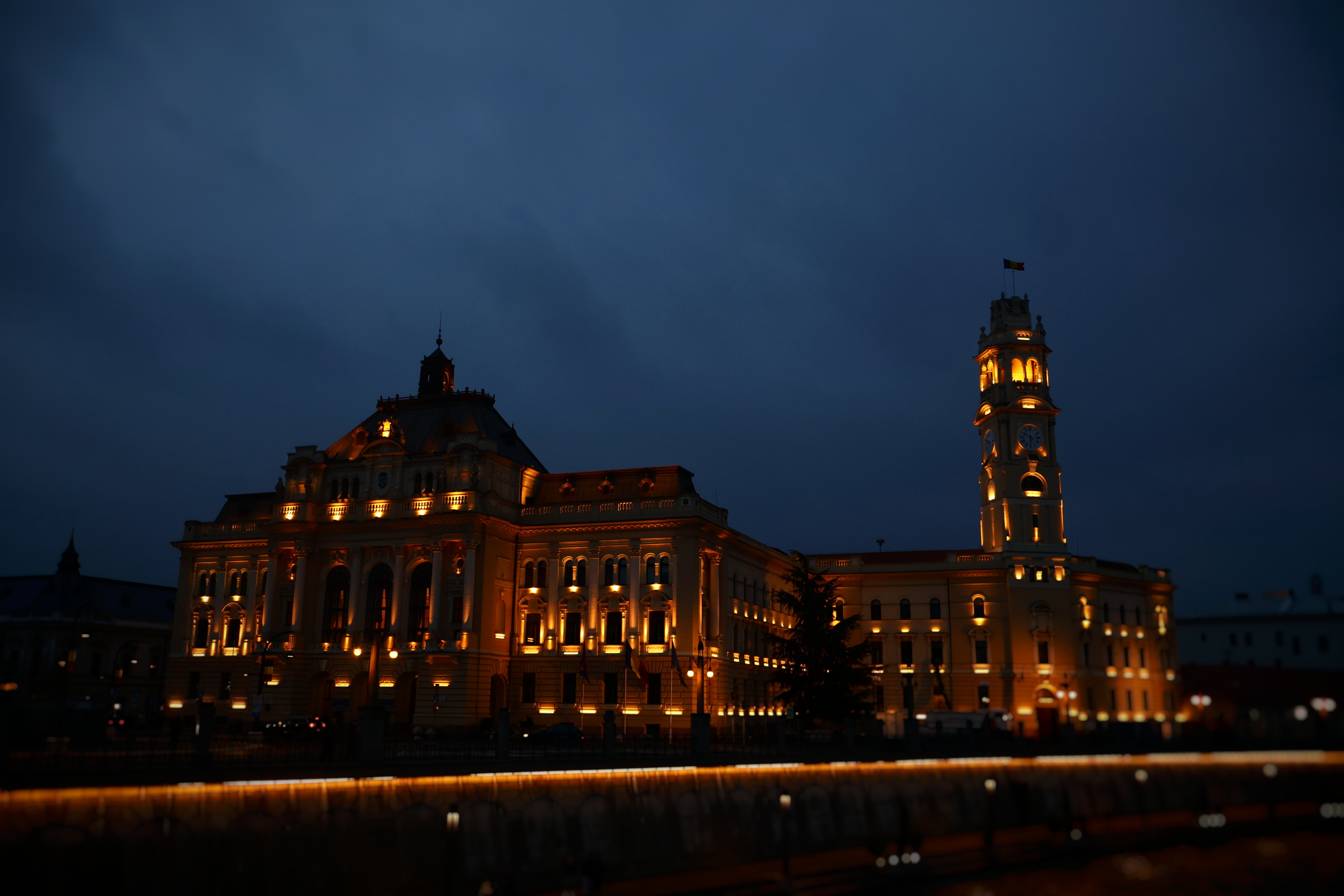
The city hall at night

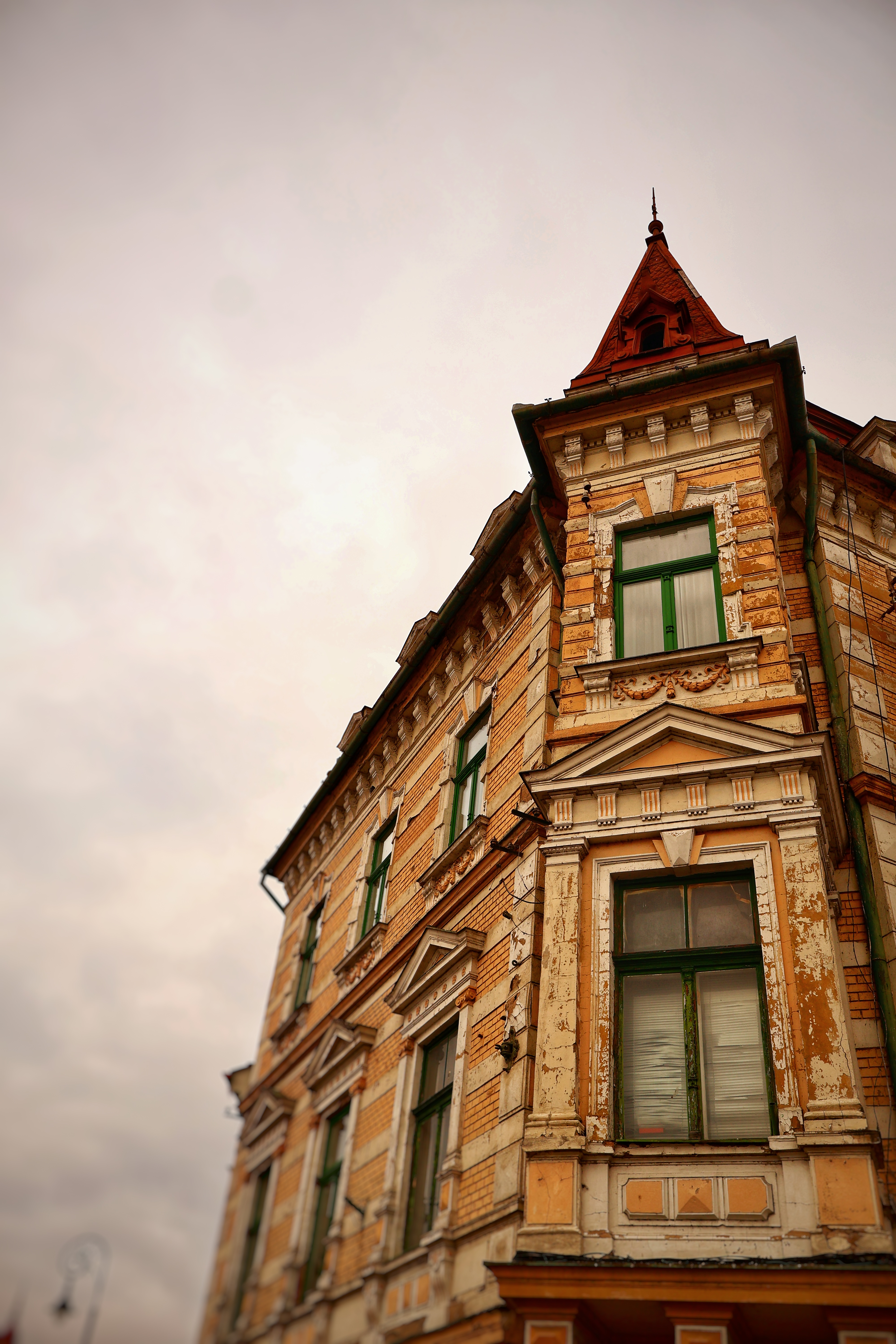
Lévay Palace

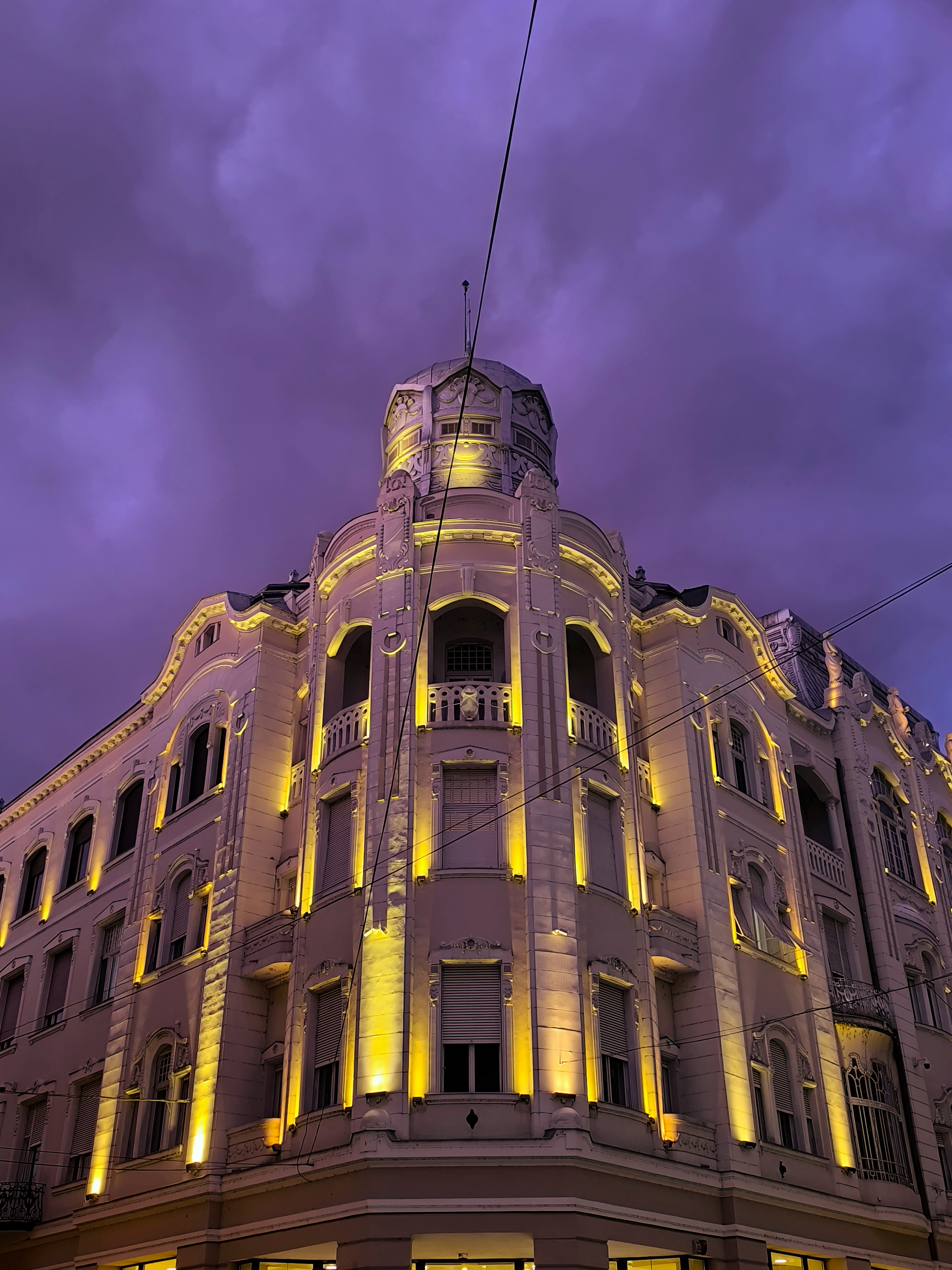
Apollo Palace

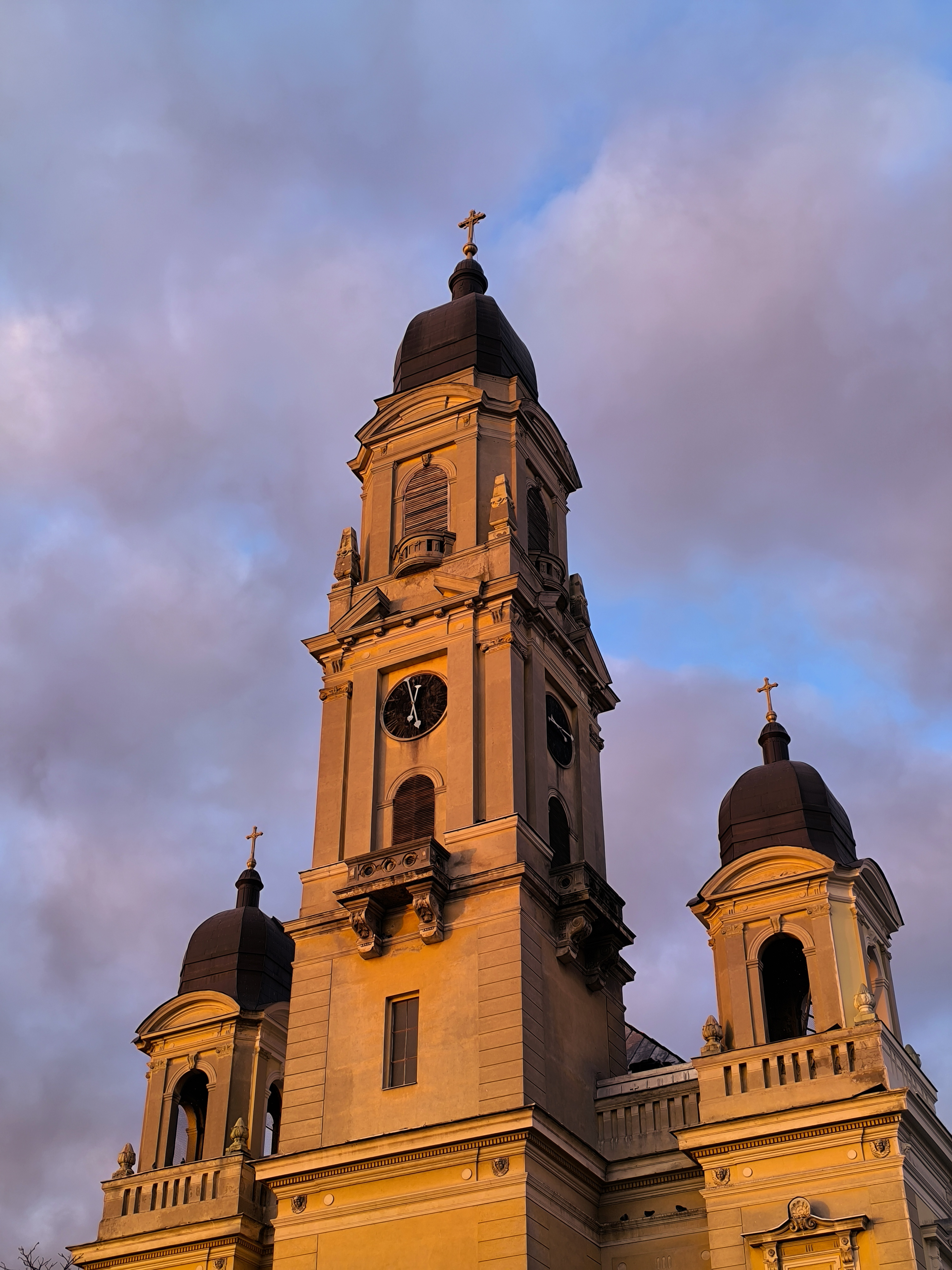
"Barátok Temploma" - catholic church

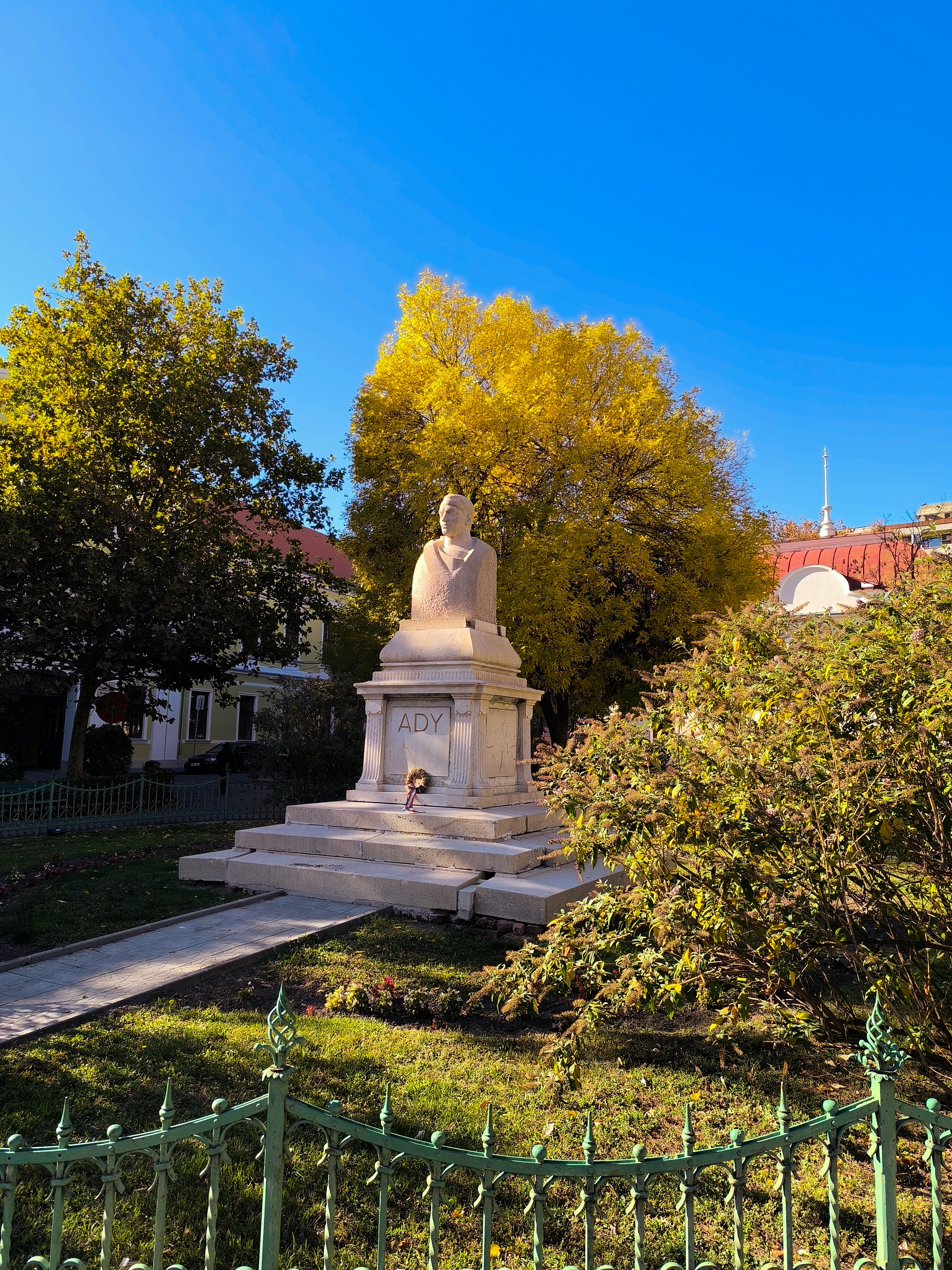
Ady Endre Statue

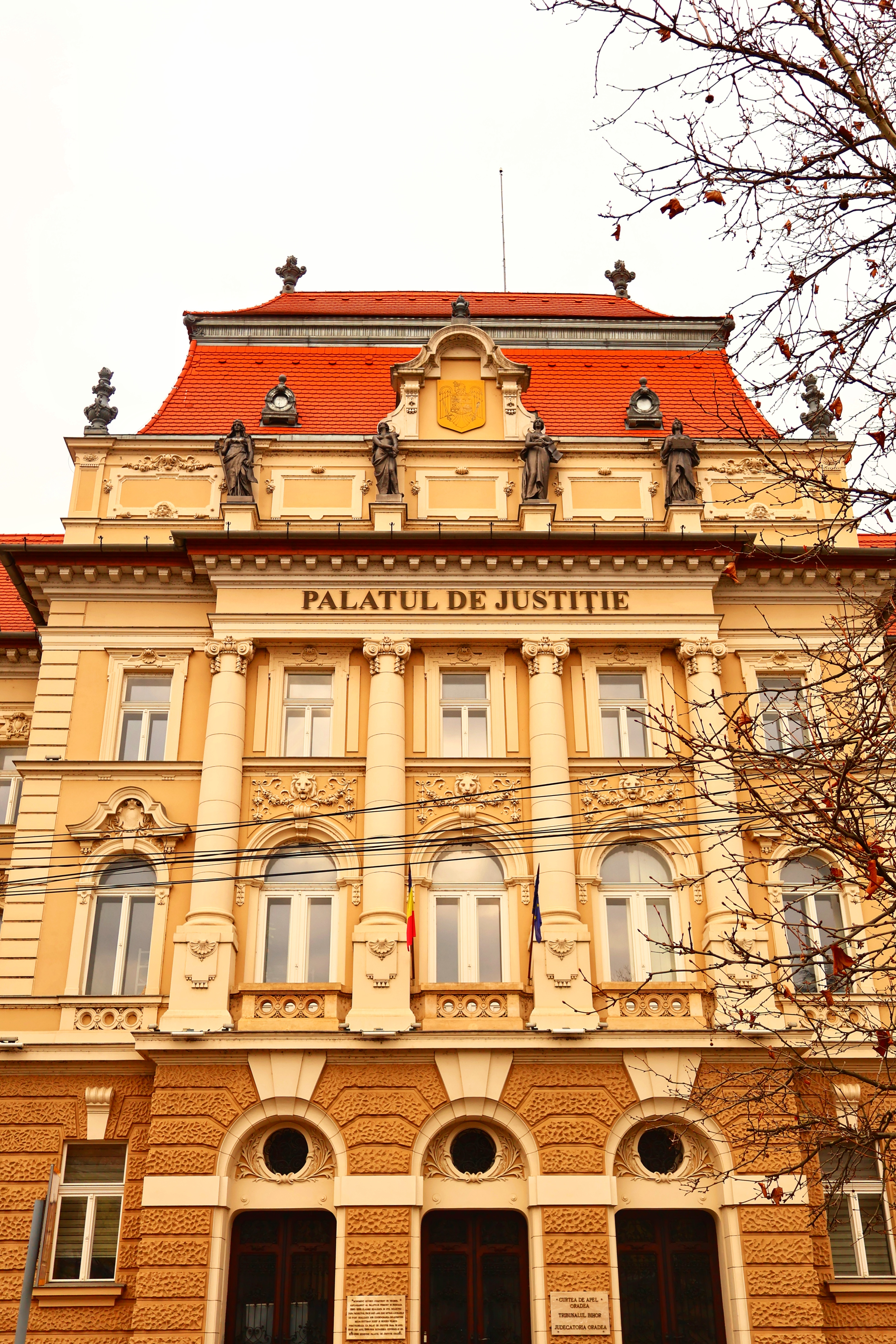

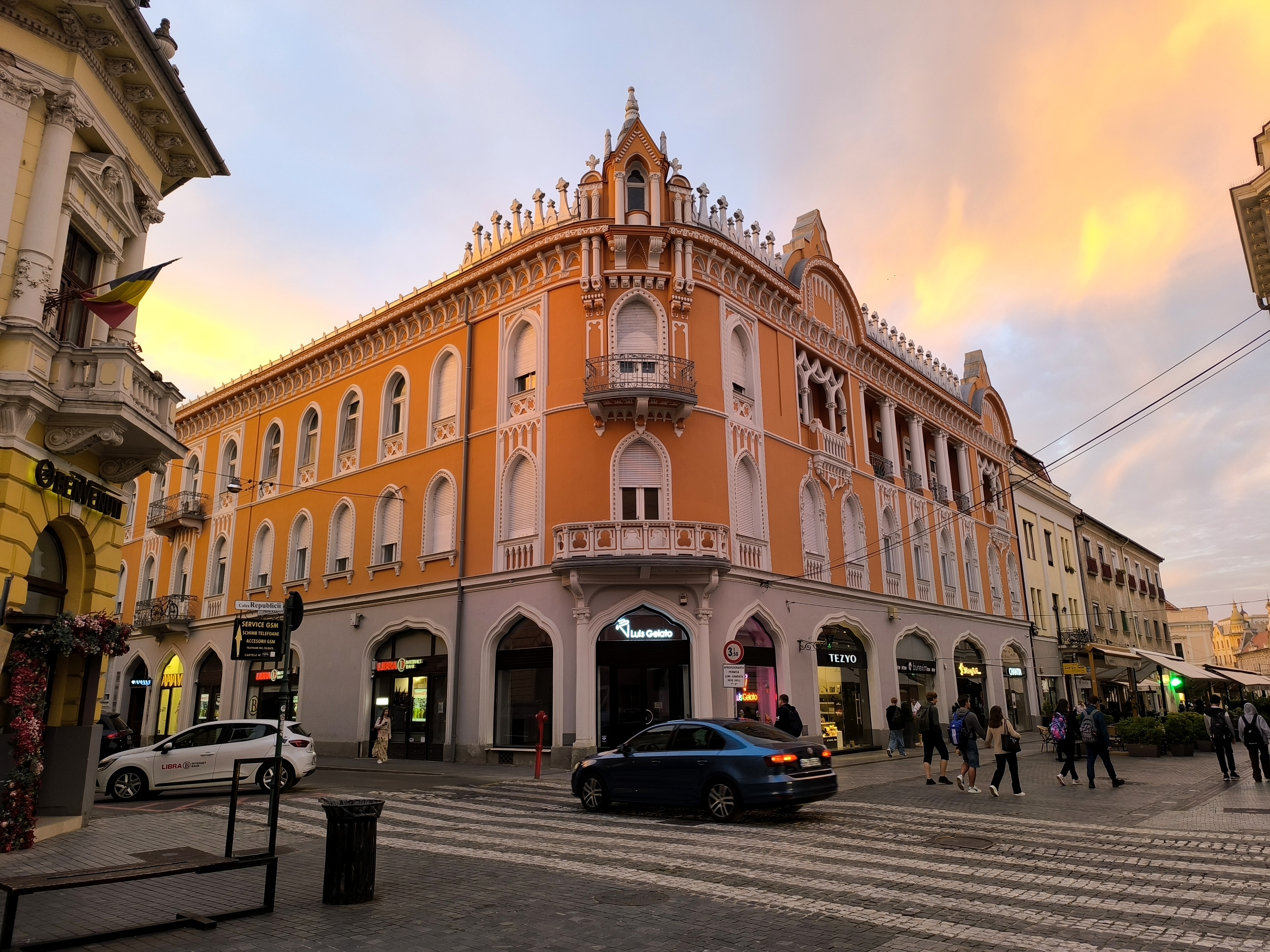

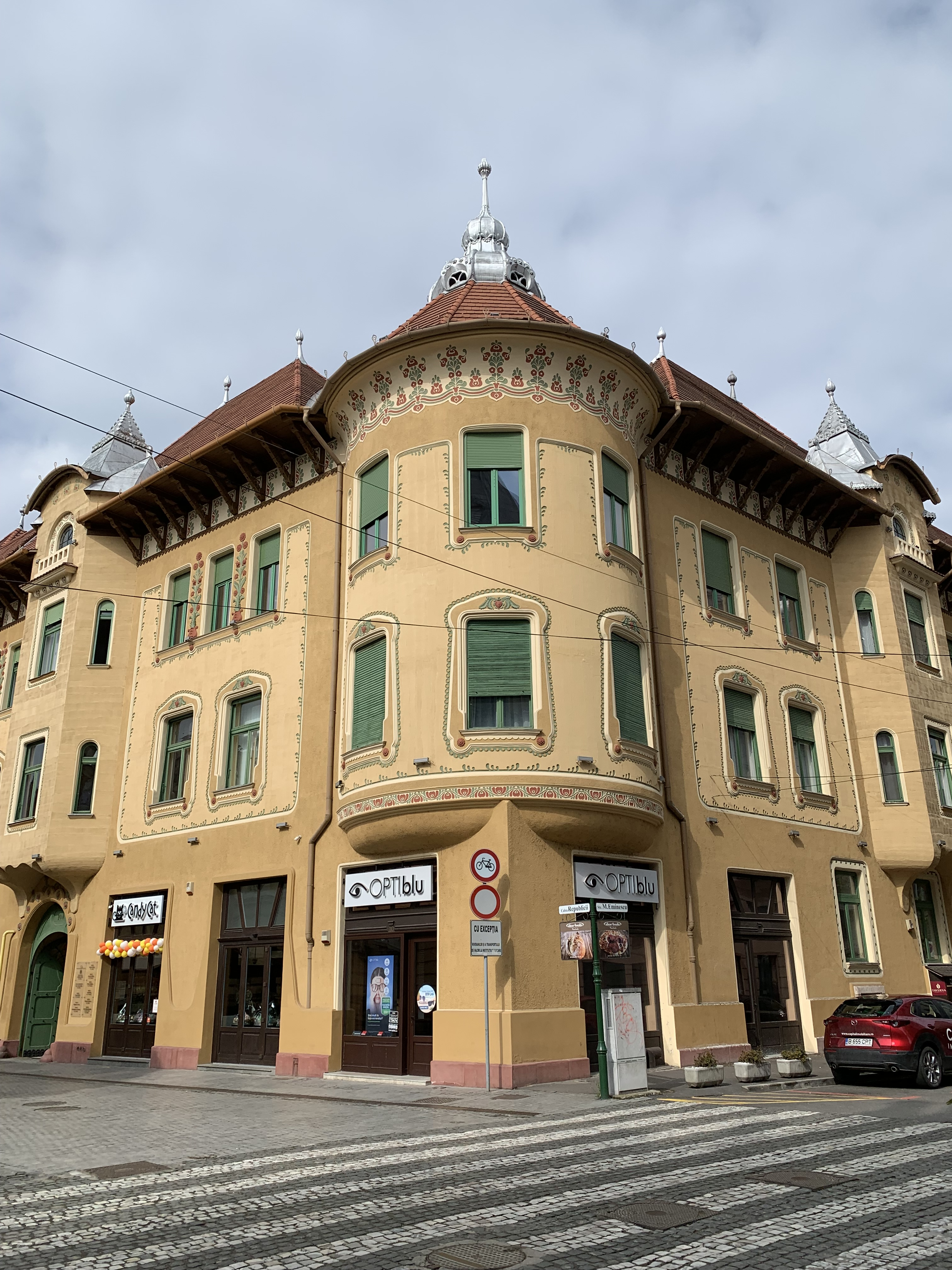

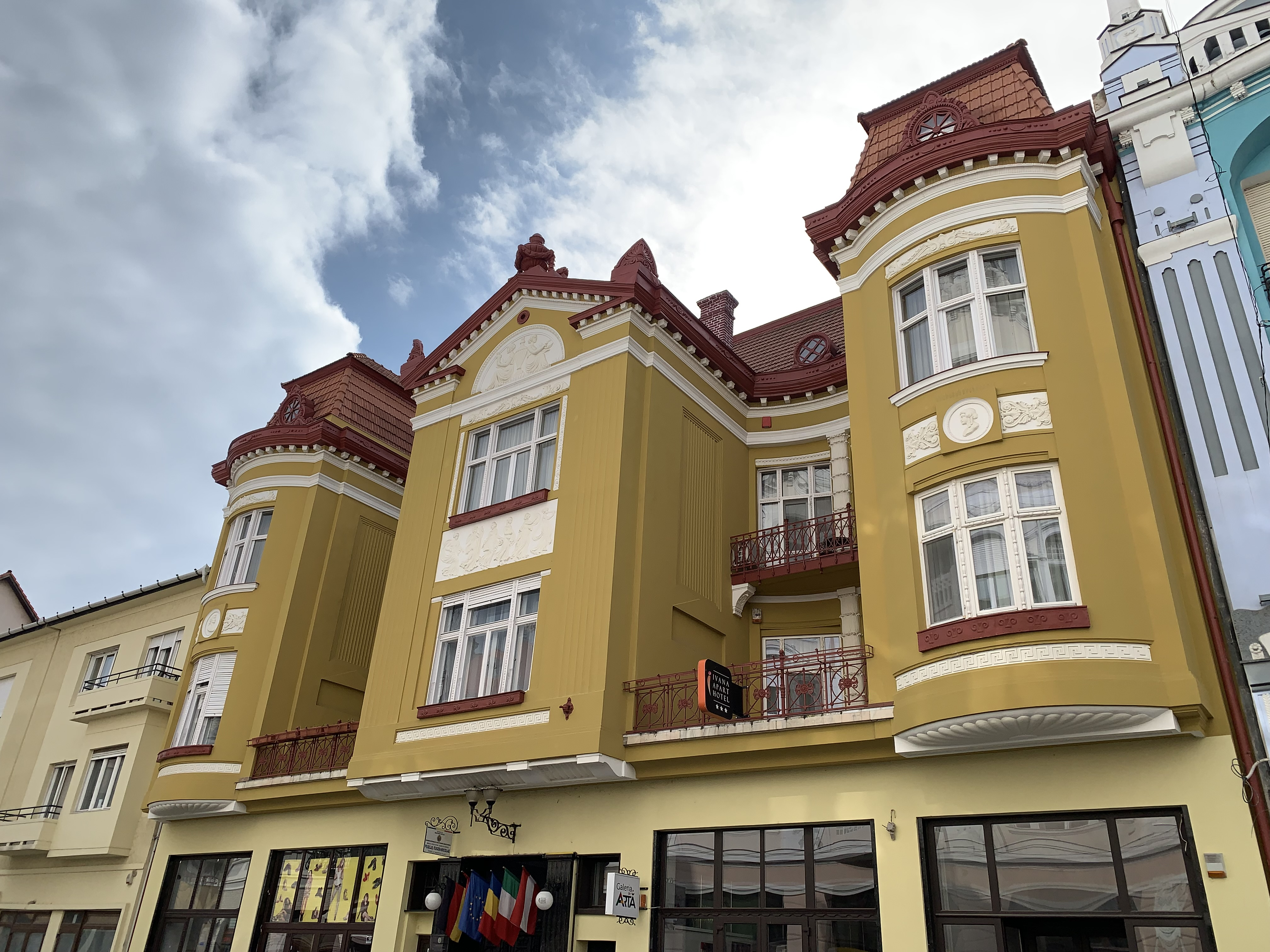

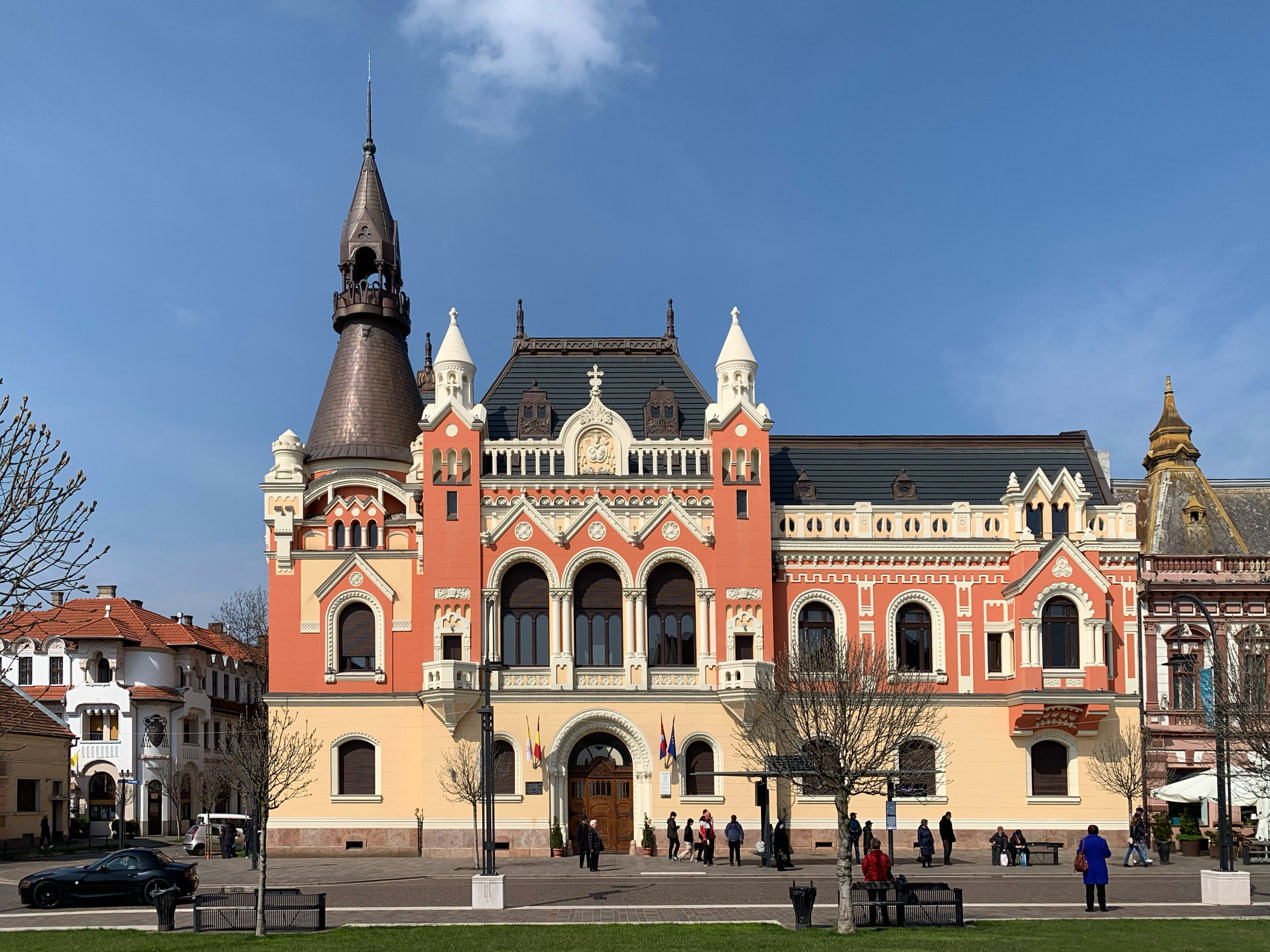

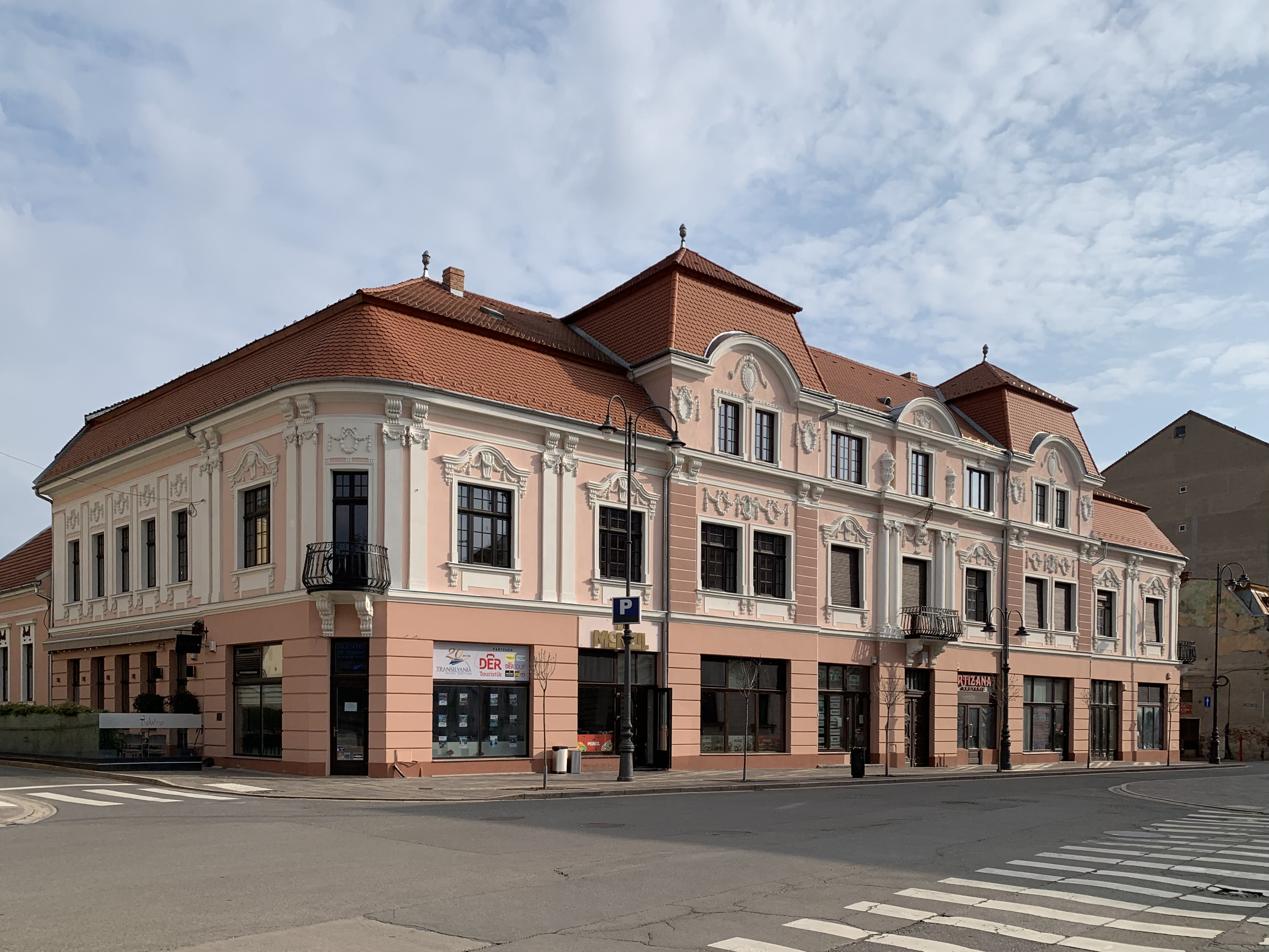
Klosubusitzky Palace

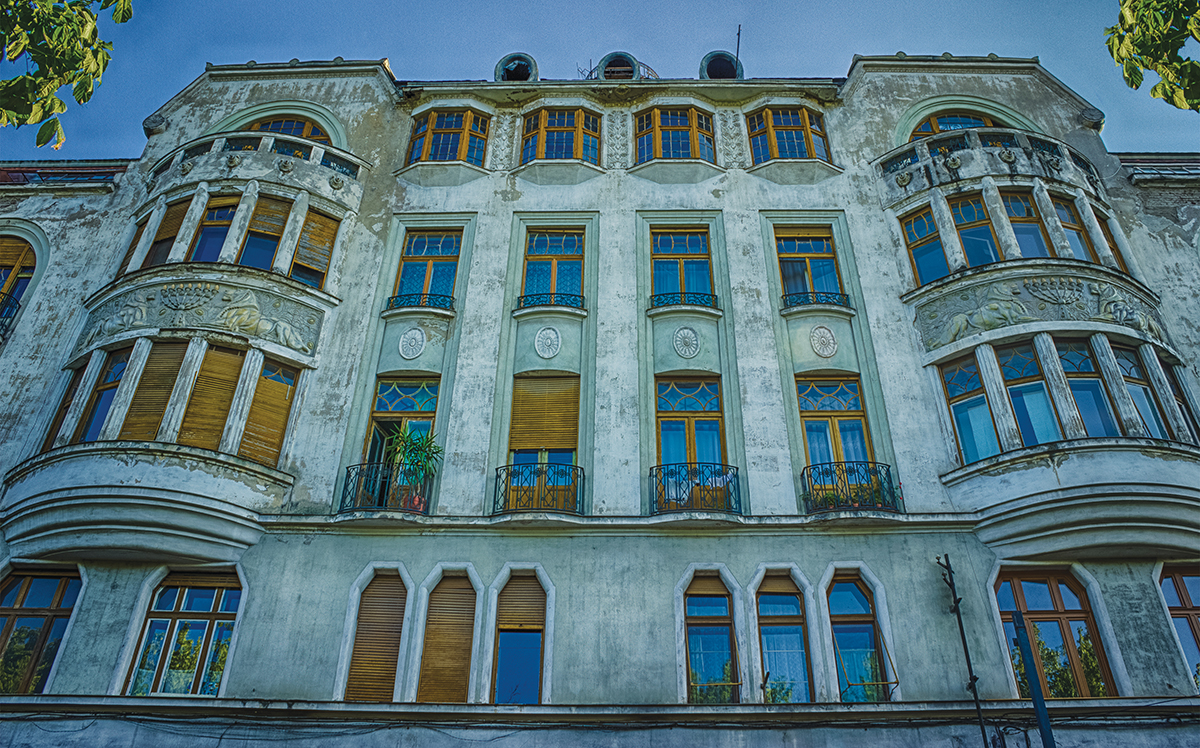

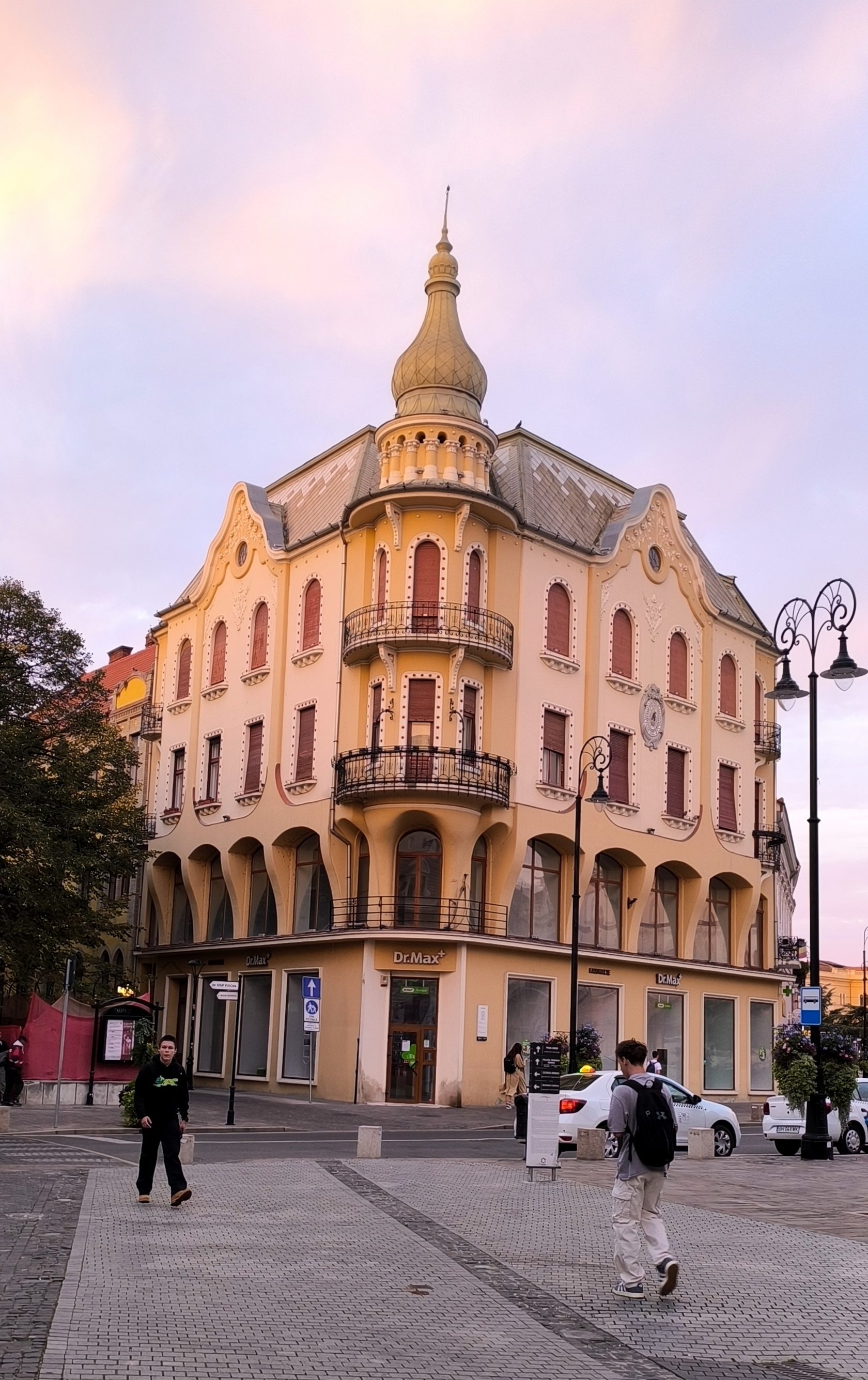
Poynár house

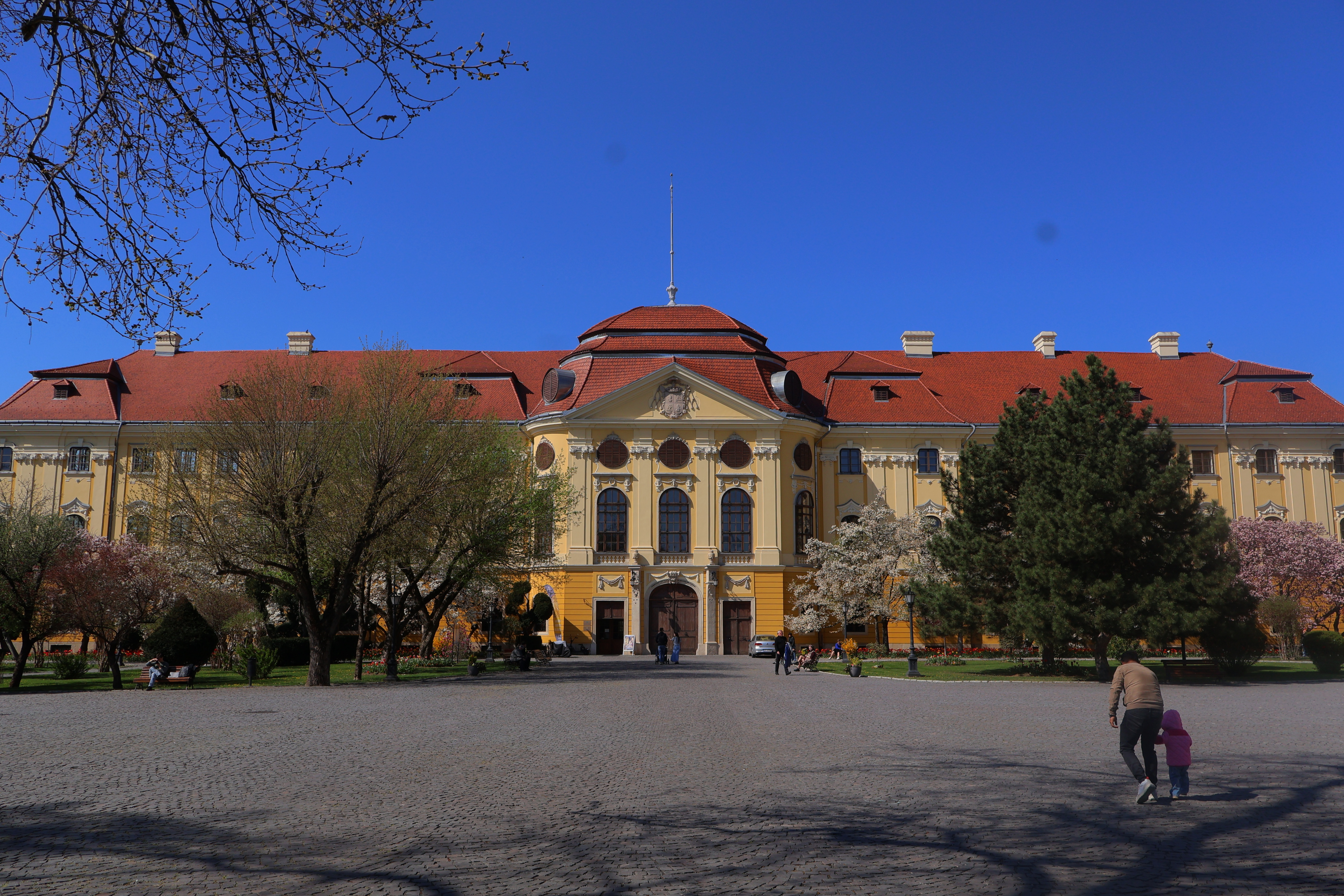
Episcopal Palace

== Notable people ==
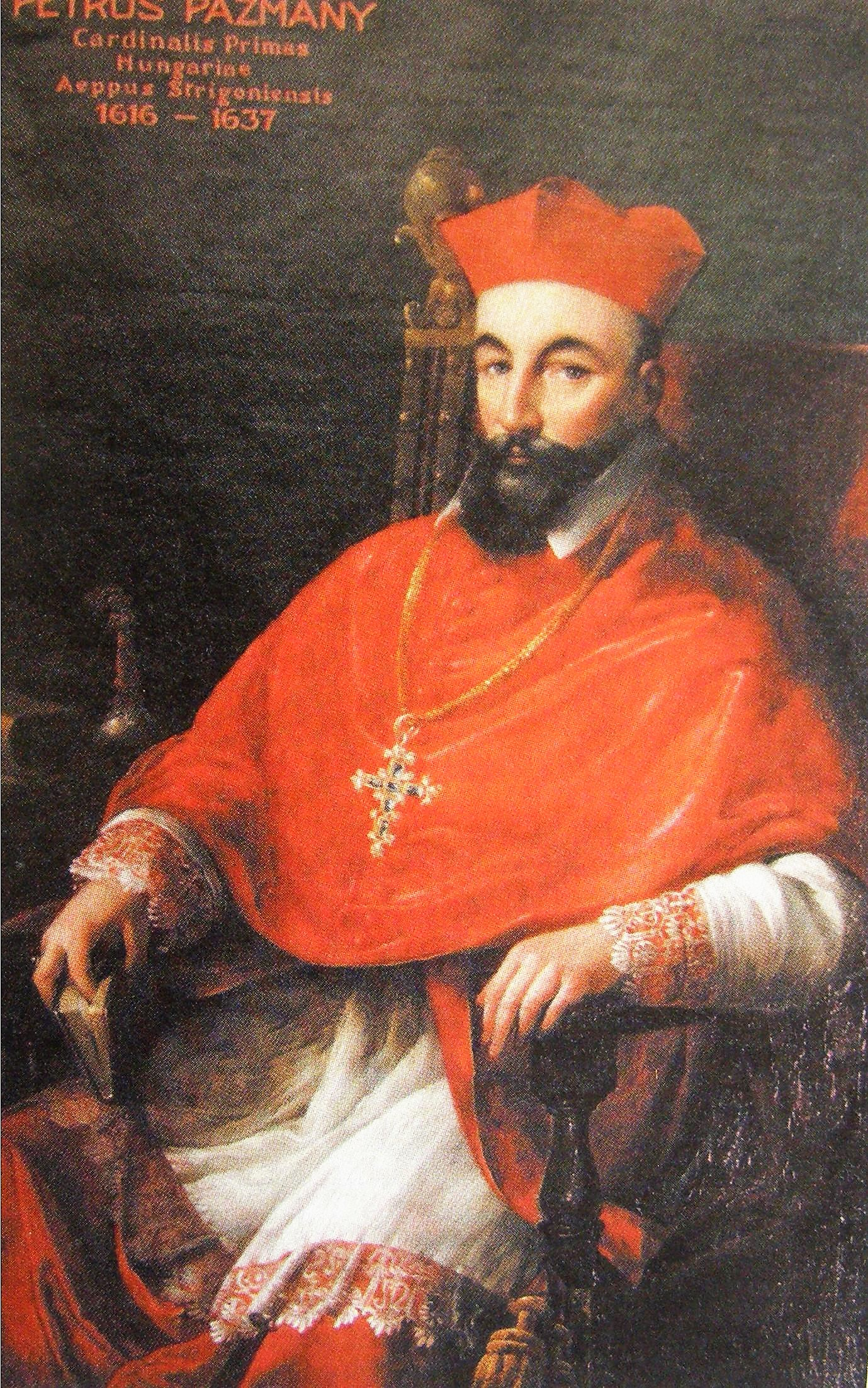
Péter Pázmány, 17th C.

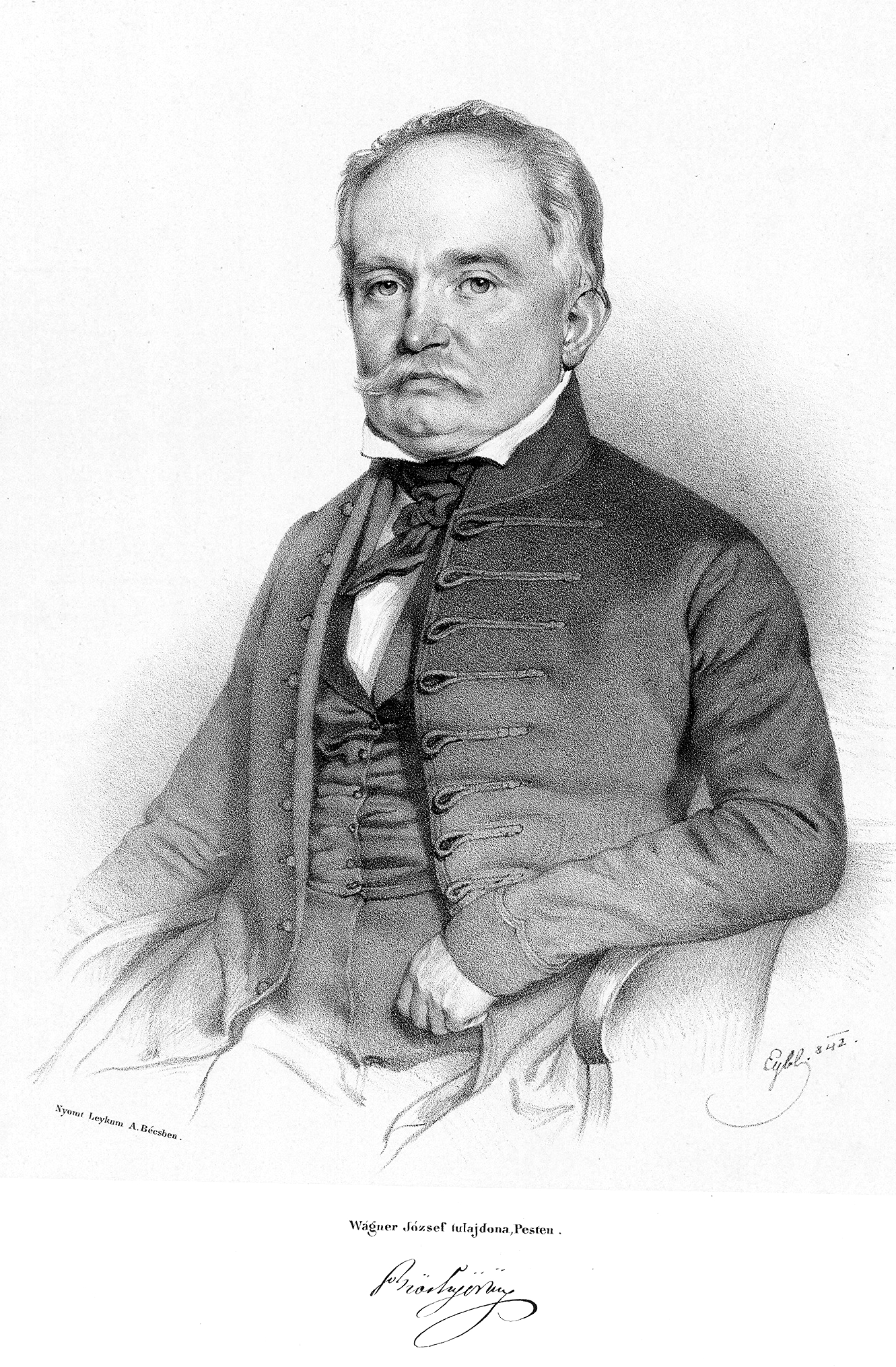
Ödön Beöthy, 1842

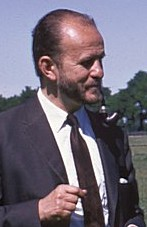
Nándor Wagner, 1964

=== Those born in Oradea ===
- Péter Pázmány (1570–1637), philosopher, theologian, cardinal
- Sigismund Báthory (1572–1613), prince of Transylvania
- Gabriel Báthory (1589–1613), prince of Transylvania
- Francis Rhédey (1610–1667), prince of Transylvania
- Ödön Beöthy (1796–1854), Hungarian deputy and orator
- Emanoil Gojdu (1802–1870), lawyer
- József Nagysándor (1803–1849), honvéd general in the Hungarian Army
- Ede Szigligeti (1814–1878), playwright
- Antal Csengery, (1822–1880), publicist and historical writer
- Kálmán Tisza (1830–1902) the Hungarian prime minister between 1875 and 1890
- Lucreția Suciu-Rudow (1859–1900), poetess
- Ferenc Julier (1878–1944), Hungarian military officer, chief of staff of the Hungarian Soviet Republic in 1919, then military writer
- Lajos Bíró (1880–1948), novelist, playwright and screenwriter
- Lajos Jambor (1884–1954), painter, muralist, illustrator
- Ernő Tibor (1885–1945), Impressionist and Neo-Impressionist painter
- Georges Politzer (1903–1942), French philosopher, Marxist theoretician and resistance member
- Ernő Grünbaum (1908–1945), Expressionist painter
- Iuliu Baratky (1910–1962), footballer
- Francisc Spielmann (1916–1974), footballer
- Nándor Wagner (1922–1997), sculptor
- János Kristófi (1925–2014), painter
- Ovidiu Cotruș (1926–1977), essayist and literary critic
- Mircea Malița (1927–2018), academic, diplomat, and politician
- Mircea Zaciu (1928–2000), critic and literary historian
- Titus Popovici (1930–1994), screenwriter
- Eva Heyman (1931–1944), Jewish girl, often compared to Anne Frank because of the diary she kept
- Iosif Demian (b. 1941), cinematographer and film director
- A. G. Weinberger (b. 1965), musician and radio producer
- Gavril Farkas (b. 1973), mathematician
- Cosmin Bărcăuan (b. 1978), football player
- Erik Lincar (b. 1978), football player and manager
- Alin Suciu (b. 1978), coptologist and papyrologist
- Kálmán Kádár (b. 1979), water polo player
- Mihai Neșu (b. 1983), football player
- Gabriella Szűcs (b. 1984), handball player
- Claudiu Keșerü (b. 1986), football player

=== Those who lived in Oradea ===
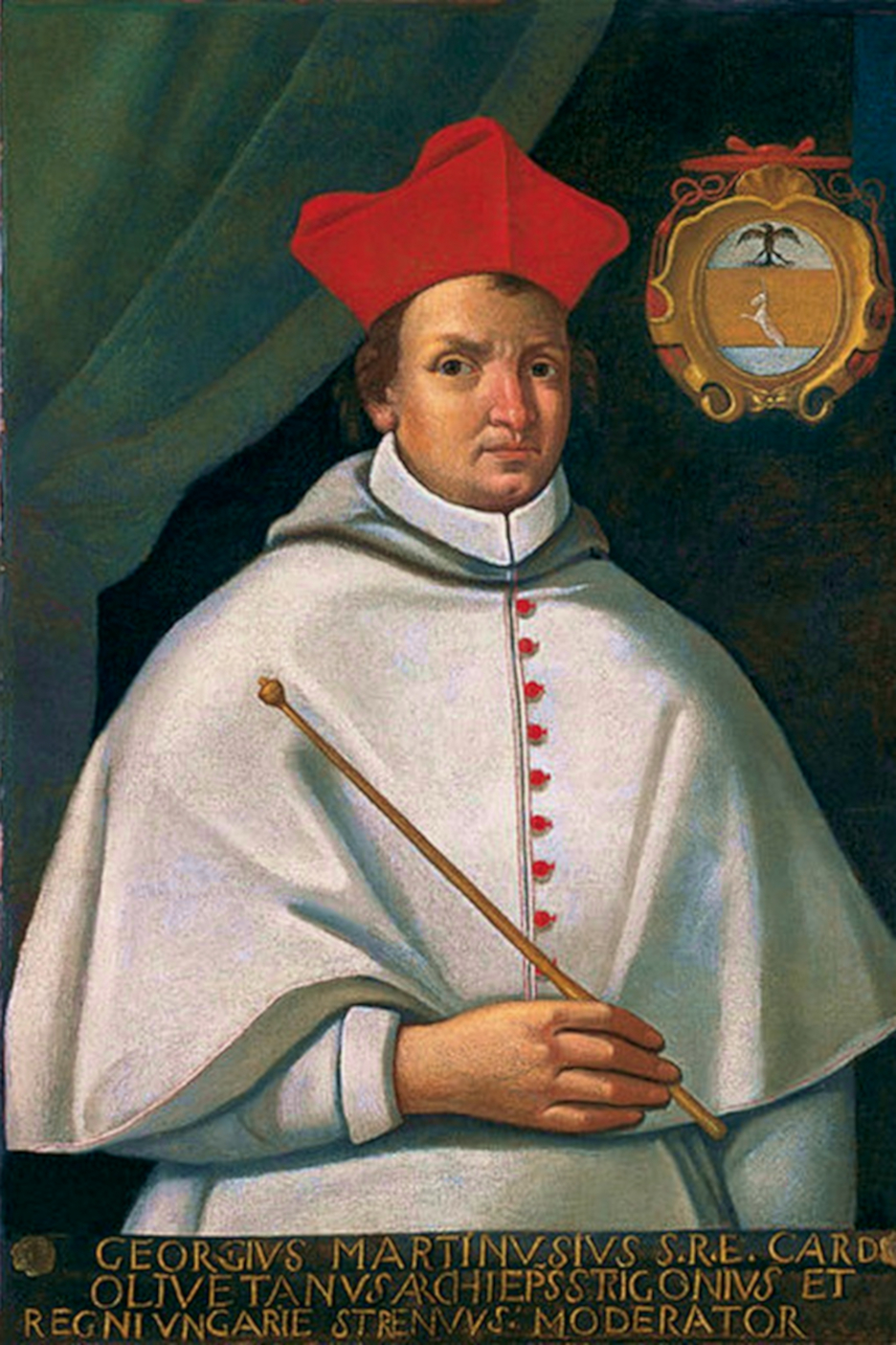
Cardinal George Martinuzzi, 18th C.

- Roger of Torre Maggiore (1205–1266), Italian monk
- John Vitéz (1408–1472), bishop and humanist, he established in Oradea the first observatory from Southeast Europe
- George Martinuzzi (1482–1551), Bishop of Nagyvárad
- Michael Haydn (1737–1806), Austrian composer
- Ignațiu Darabant (1738–1805), Eparchy of Oradea Mare bishop
- Carl Ditters von Dittersdorf (1739–1799), Austrian composer and violinist
- Wenzel Pichl (1741–1805), Czech composer
- Samuil Vulcan (1758–1839), Eparchy of Oradea Mare bishop
- Mihail Pavel (1827–1902), Eparchy of Oradea Mare bishop
- Iosif Vulcan (1841–1907), magazine editor, poet, playwright, novelist
- Roman Ciorogariu (1852–1936), Romanian Orthodox bishop
- Demetriu Radu (1861–1920), Eparchy of Oradea Mare bishop
- Valeriu Traian Frențiu (1875–1952), Eparchy of Oradea Mare bishop
- Endre Ady (1877–1919), Hungarian poet
- Alex Leon (1907–1944), painter
- Iuliu Bodola (1912–1992), football player
- Emerich Jenei (1937–2025), former football player and coach
- Alexandru Darie (1959–2019), theater director
- Antonio Alexe (1969–2005), basketball player

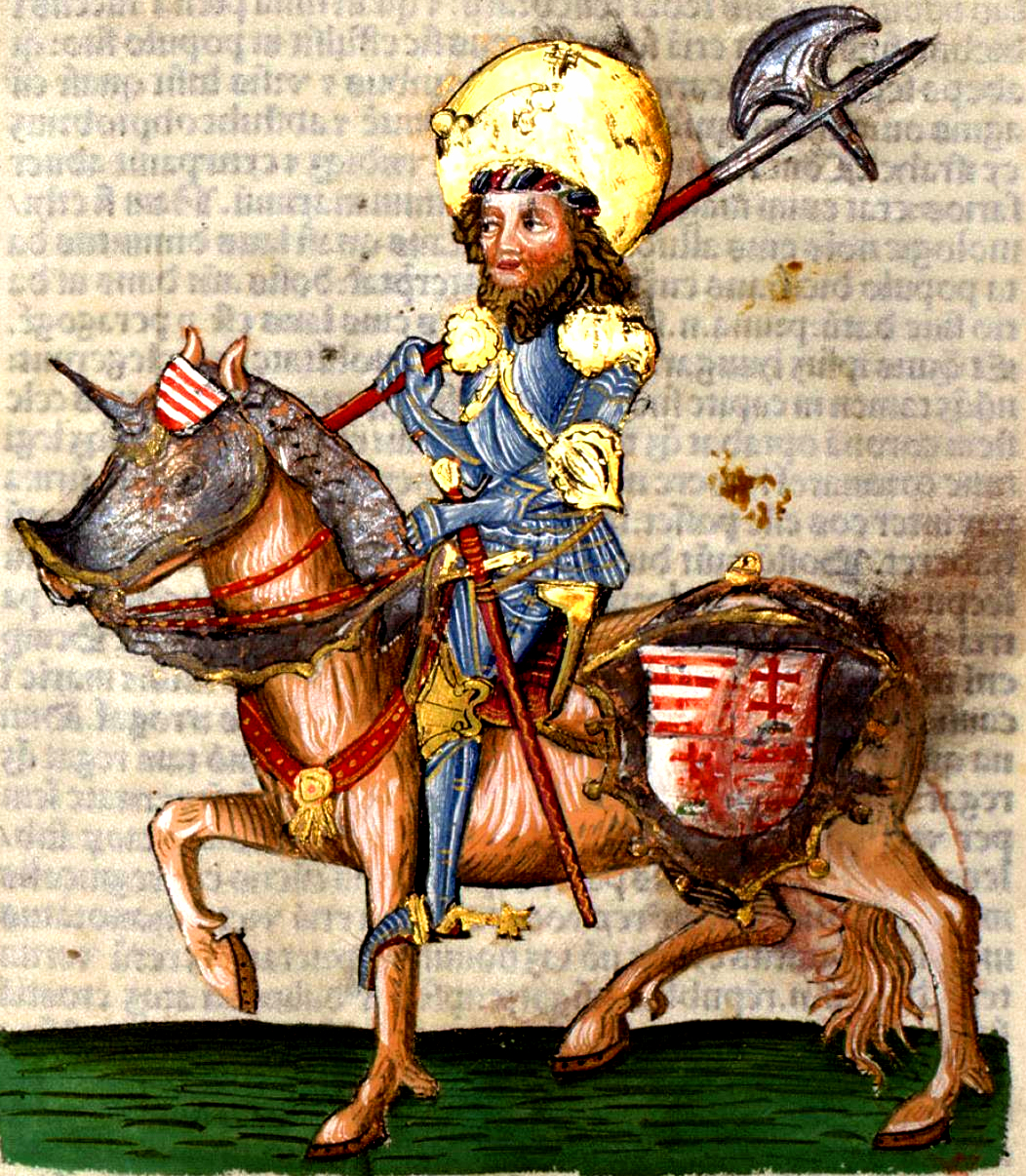
Ladislaus I, 1488

=== Royalty buried in Oradea ===
- Ladislaus I of Hungary (1040–1095)
- Stephen II of Hungary (1101–1131)
- Andrew II of Hungary (1175–1235)
- Fenenna of Kuyavia (1276–1295)
- Beatrice of Luxembourg (1305–1319)
- Mary, Queen of Hungary (1371–1395)
- Sigismund, Holy Roman Emperor (1368–1437)

== See also ==
- Diocese of Oradea (disambiguation)
- History of Oradea
- Timeline of Oradea
