= Anastasiya Dabizha =

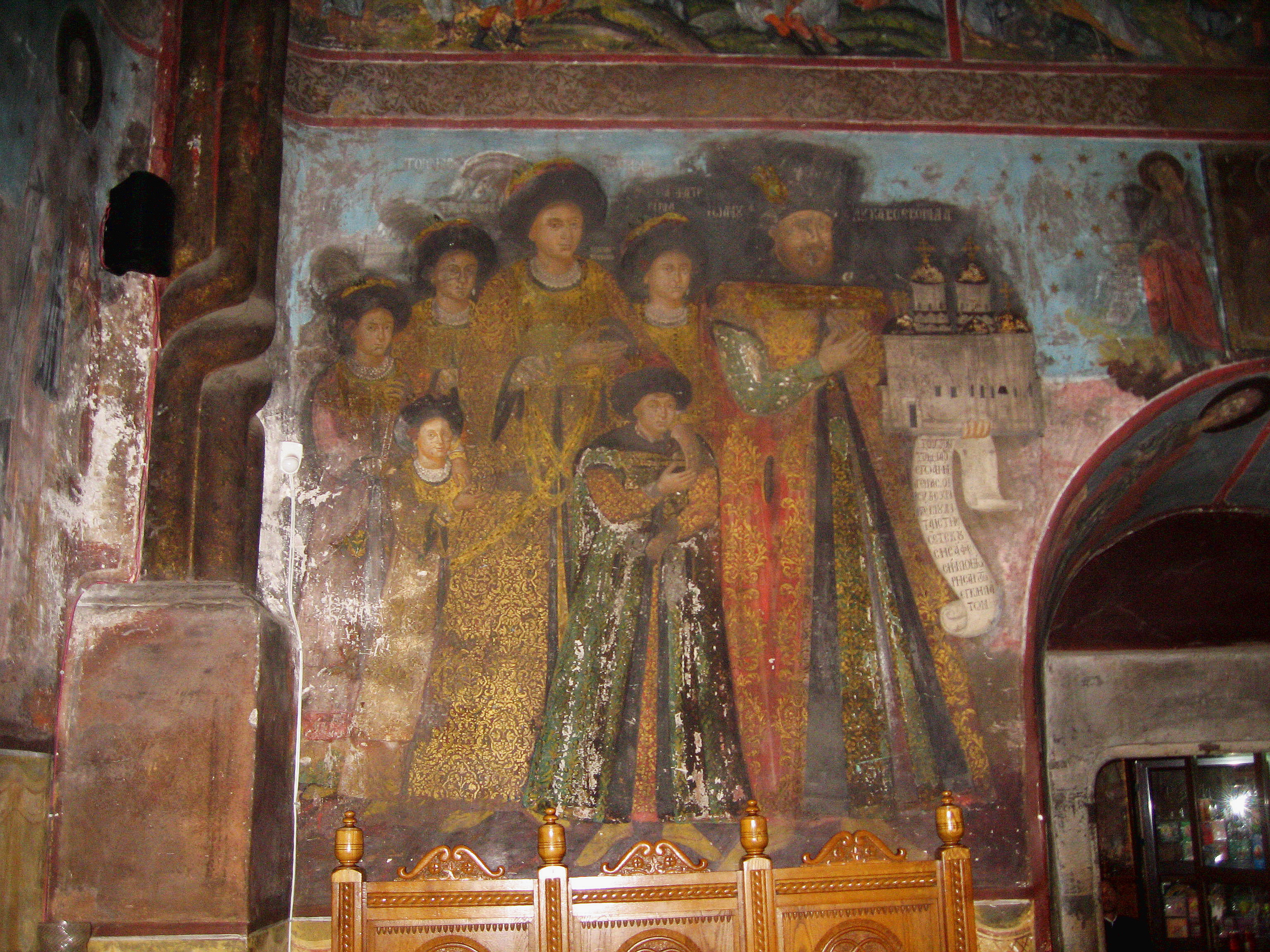
Anastasiya, her husband Gheorghe Duca and some of their children on a mural of the Cetățuia Monastery

Anastasiya Dabizha (b. 1631–1632 – d. 1703), was a princess of Moldavia and Wallachia and a Hetmana of Ukraine by marriage to George Ducas, Prince of Moldavia, Prince of Wallachia, and Hetman of Ukraine (r. 1681-1685).

== Biography ==
She was daughter of Dafina Catrina, princess-consort of Moldova, by her first husband the Grand Treasurer Dumitry Buhus. When widowed, Dafina Catrina then married Eustratie Dabija, whom the family made Prince of Moldavia in 1661.

Anastasiya Dabizha is known for her love life, as she had a number of lovers, notably Șerban Cantacuzino, prince of Wallachia in 1678-88, which was reported as a scandal in contemporary annals. She was also a political supporter of her spouse, and managed to secure a great loan to finance his power as hetman in Ukraine.

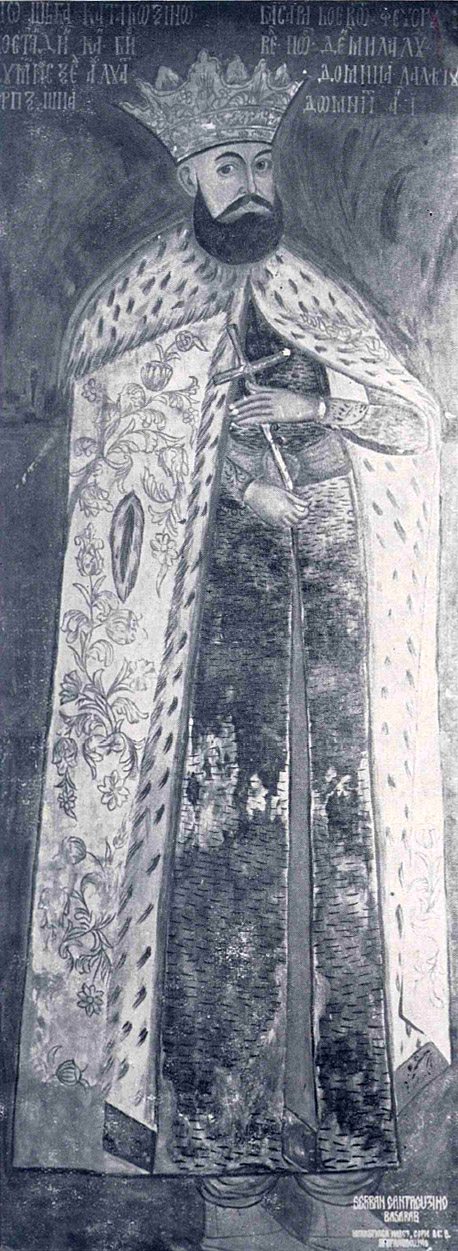
Anastasya's lover Prince Șerban Cantacuzino, at the Horezu Monastery.
