= Eustratie Dabija =

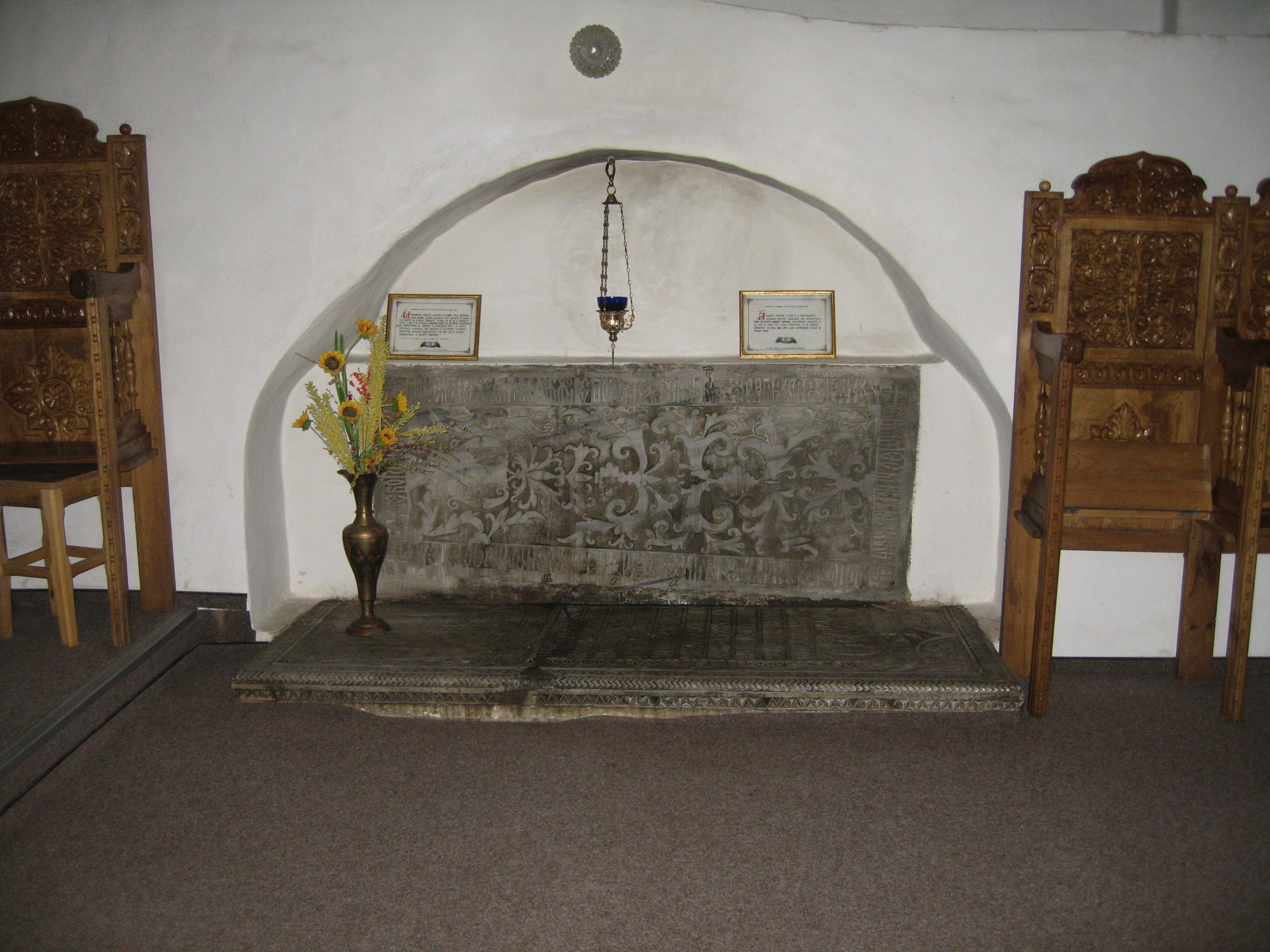
- View of the burial, at the Bârnova Monastery

Prince of Moldavia
- Reign: 19 September 1661 – 11 September 1665
- Predecessor: Ștefăniță Lupu
- Successor: George Ducas
- Born: unknown
- Died: 11 September 1665
- Issue: Anastasiya Dabizha
- Religion: Orthodox

Eustratie (or Istrate) "the Drunk" Dabija (? – 11 September 1665) was Prince (Voivode) of Moldavia between 1661 and his death in September 1665.

== Rule ==
As financial collapse had marked the history of Moldavia for several decades running, Dabija is noted for re-introducing the mint in Suceava from his first year of rule. Previous large-scale inflation and devaluation had made Moldavian currency undesirable, so the state had to resort to issuing counterfeit coinage, mainly Swedish and Livonian shillings and riksdalers. Produced with the assistance of Polish mintmaster Tito Livio Burattini, the imitations are, usually, of extremely poor quality. The only proper monetary issue of his rule are the şalăi (in sources that use Latin, they are referred to as solidi), the smallest coin on the market.

Eustratie Dabija assisted the Ottomans during two of their campaigns into Transdanubia against the Habsburgs, in 1663 and 1664.

He was the step-father of Anastasiya Dabizha.

He was the father of Maria Dabizha. Her family married her to a rising politician of the country, Iordache Rosetti, But Maria died in a few years after the wedding.

Mihai Eminescu's poem, Umbra lui Istrate Dabija - Voievod ("Prince Istrate Dabija's shadow"), presents the image of an inebriated and jovial leader ruling over an isolated and bucolic country.

| Preceded by Ştefăniţă Lupu | Prince/Voivode of Moldavia; 1661–1665 | Succeeded by George Ducas |
