= George Ducas =

Moldovan ruler (David DUCA 's father)

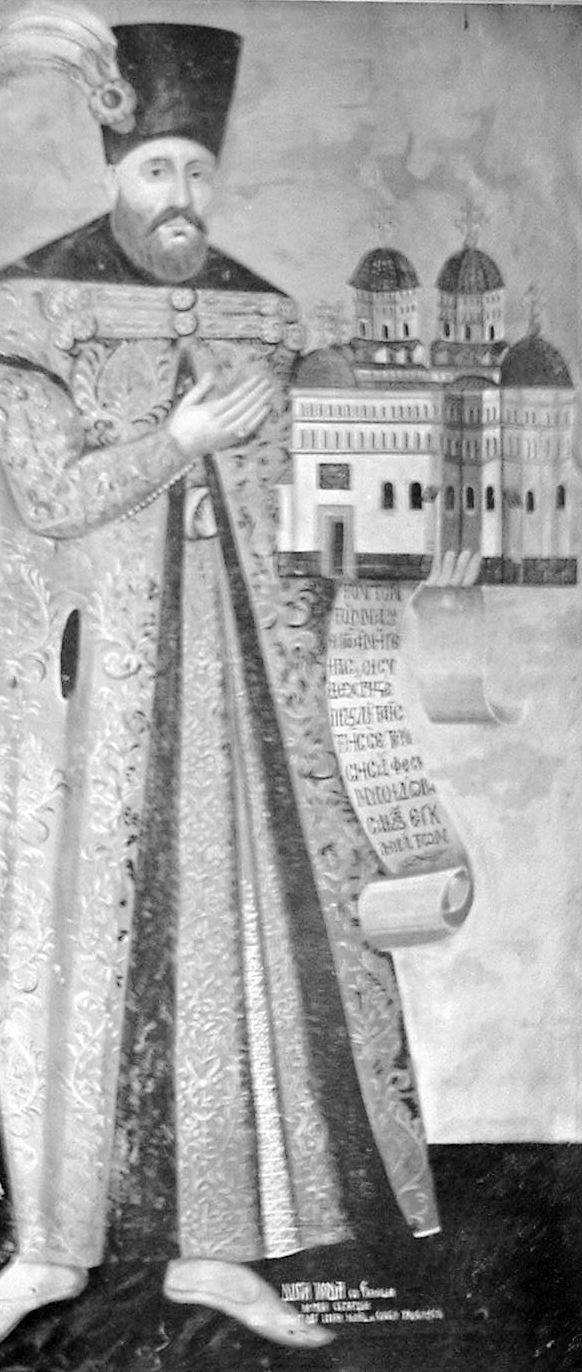
- Ducas on a mural of the Cetățuia Monastery

Prince of Moldavia (1st reign)
- Reign: 11 September 1665 – 21 May 1666
- Predecessor: Eustratie Dabija
- Successor: Iliaș Alexandru

Prince of Moldavia (2nd reign)
- Reign: 8 November 1668 – 10 August 1672
- Predecessor: Iliaș Alexandru
- Successor: Ștefan Petriceicu

Prince of Wallachia
- Reign: November/December 1674 – 29 November 1678
- Predecessor: Grigore I Ghica
- Successor: Șerban Cantacuzino

Prince of Moldavia (3rd reign)
- Reign: 28 November 1678 – 25 December 1683
- Predecessor: Antonie Ruset
- Successor: Ștefan Petriceicu

Hetman of Right-bank Ukraine
- Reign: 11 February 1681 – 25 December 1683
- Predecessor: Yurii Khmelnytsky
- Successor: Teodor Soulymenko
- Born: c. 1620; Ottoman Empire
- Died: 31 March 1685; Lwów, Poland
- Burial: Cetățuia Monastery, Iași
- Spouse: Anastasiya Dabizha, then Dafina Doamna
- Issue: Constantine Ducas (prince of Moldavia); Matei; Maria (engaged to Prince Antioh Cantemir); Catrina (wife of Prince Ștefan Tomșa); Ileana (wife of chronicler Nicolae Costin); Sanda; Safta; Anastasia
- Religion: Orthodox
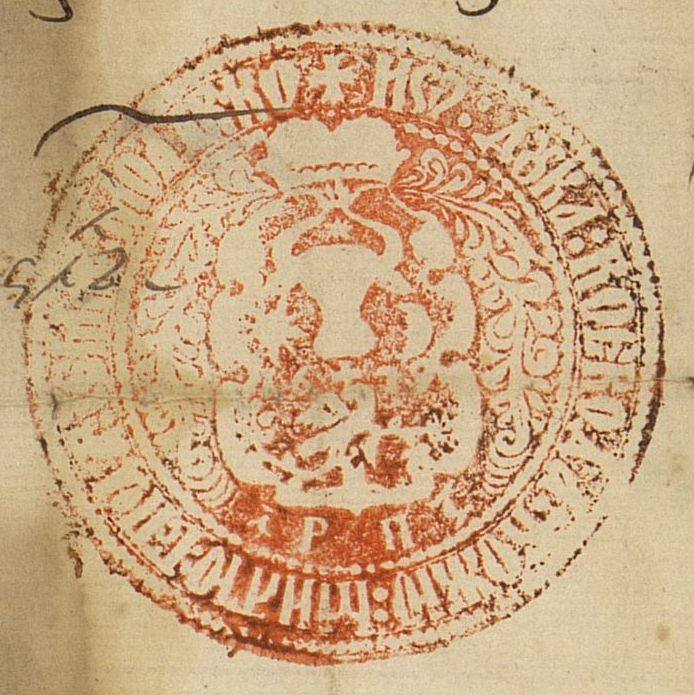
- Signature

George Ducas (Note: Greek: Γεώργιος Δούκας, Geórgios Doúkas; Romanian: Gheorghe Duca; Old Romanian: Георге Дука;.) (c. 1620 – 31 March 1685) was the prince (voivode) of Moldavia (1665–1666, 1668–1672, 1678–1684) and the prince of Wallachia (1674–1678). He also served as the hetman of Ottoman Ukraine (1681–1683).

He was married to Anastasiya Dabizha, the daughter of Prince Eustratie Dabija, and later to Dafina Doamna; George Ducas fathered Constantine Ducas.

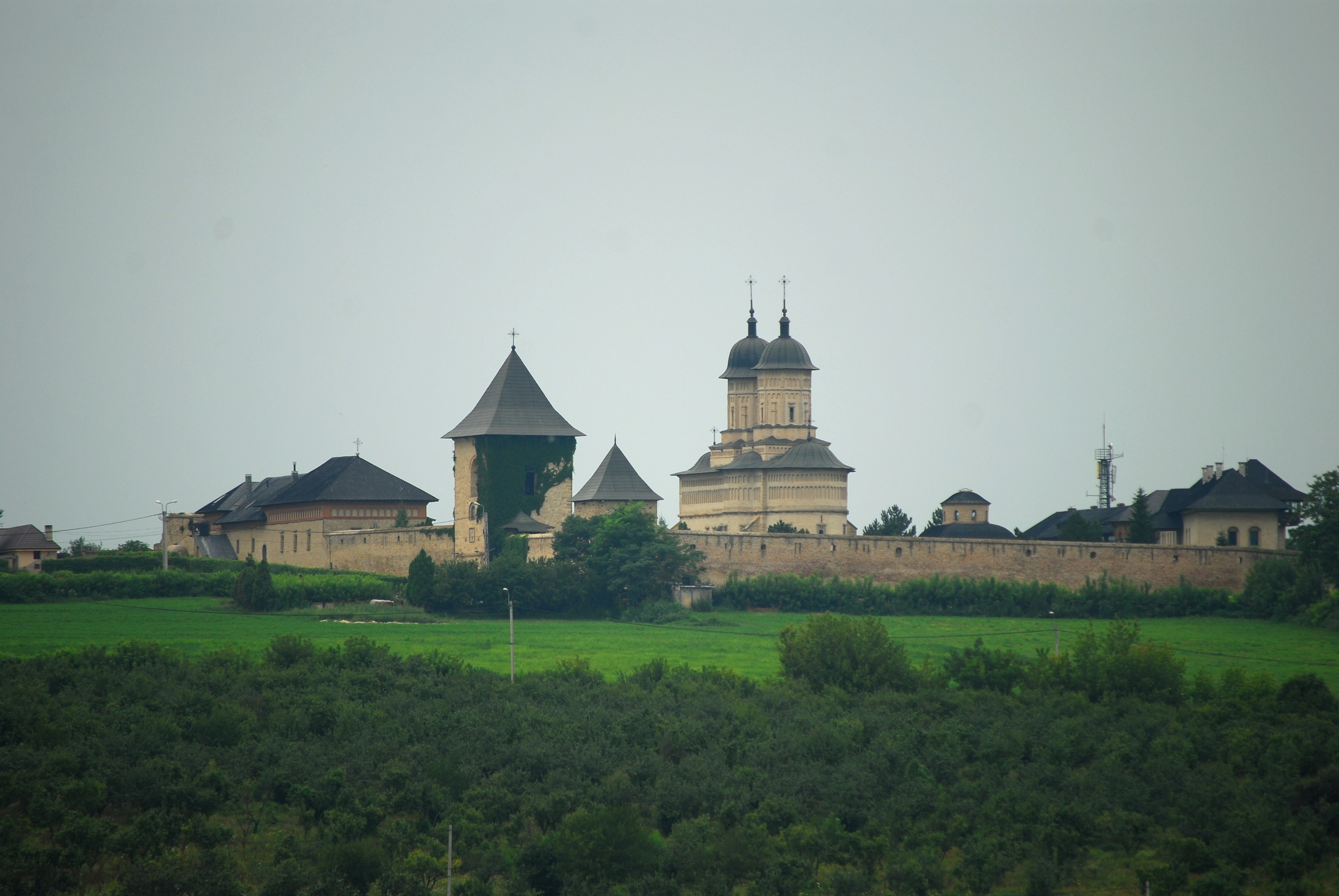
Prince Gheorghe Duca built the Cetățuia Monastery in Iași (capital of the Principality of Moldavia). It was completed in 1672.

== First two rules in Moldavia ==
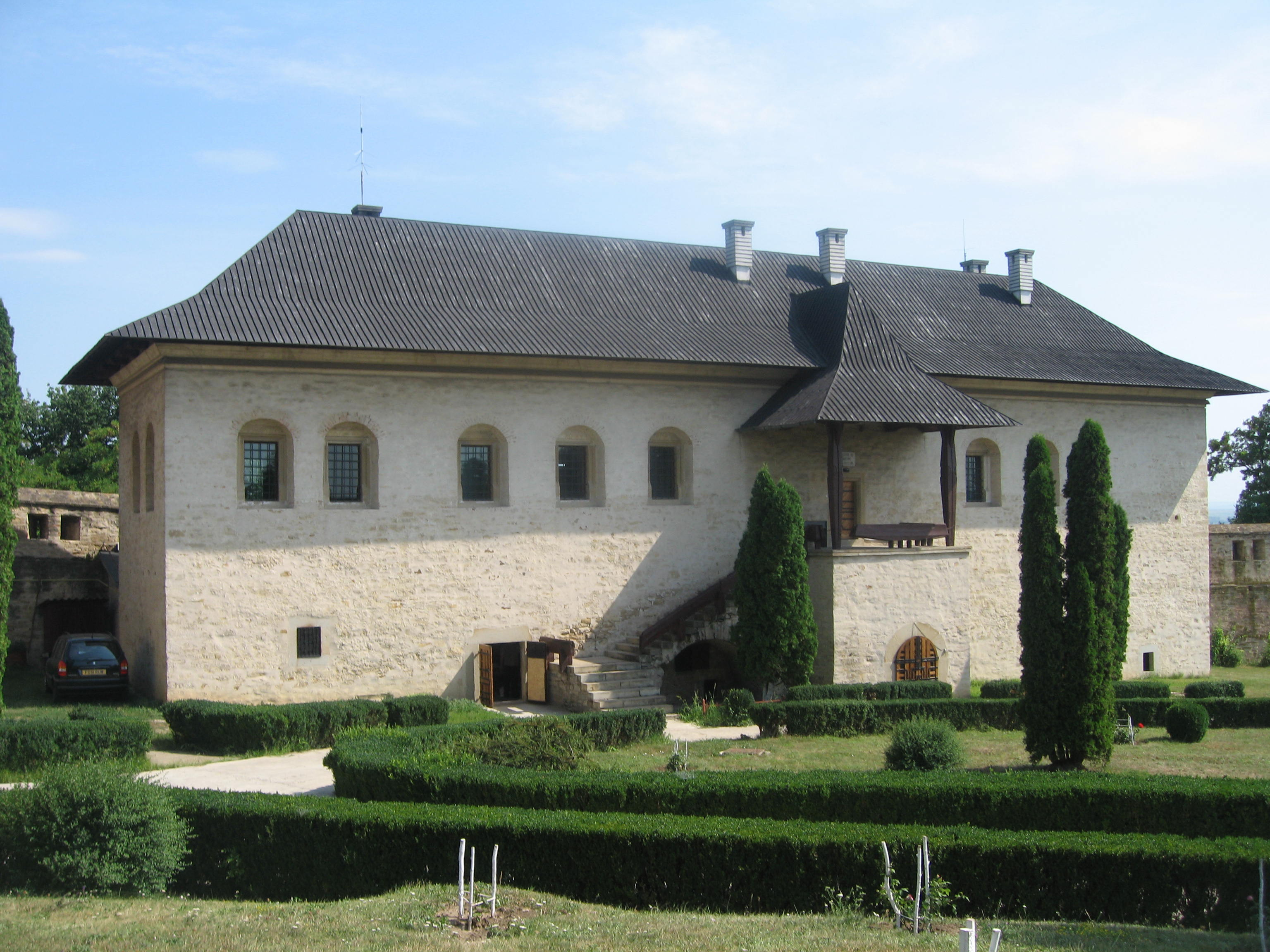
The fortified palace of the monastery was destined to the lodging of the Prince. It houses a typical 17th century hammam (bathhouse).

Gheorghe Duca was of Greek origin and like many others of his generation who had migrated to the Danubian principalities he rose thanks to his links to other Greeks of high positions. In his youth, another Greek, Vasile Lupu (voivode of Moldavia) took him to his court where Duca was raised.

Supported by Dafina Doamna and some of the boyars, he came to the throne in Iaşi after Dabija's death, but was soon ousted after his opponents appealed to the Ottomans, unjustly claiming Duca's rule was corrupt.

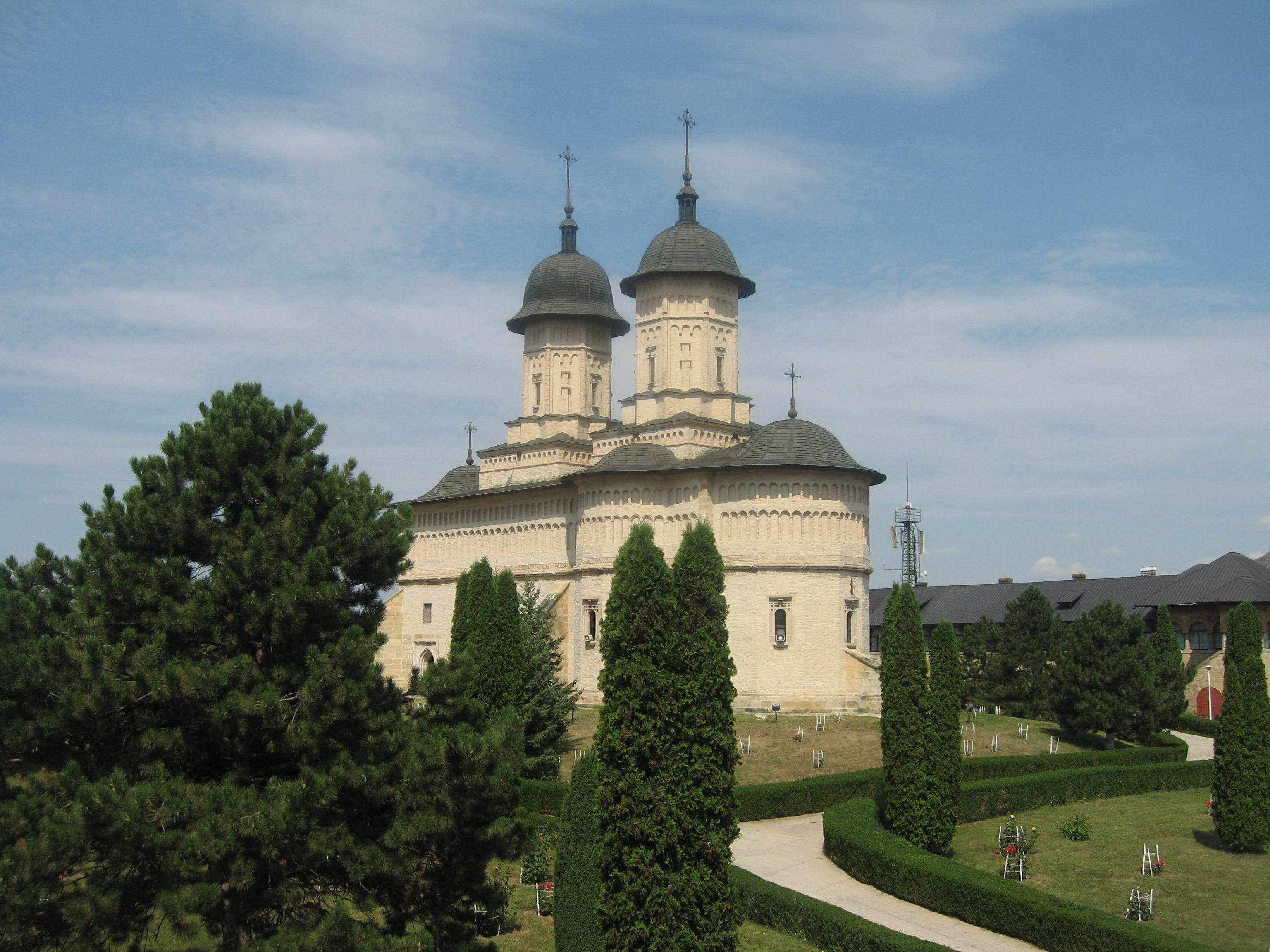
The monastery church.

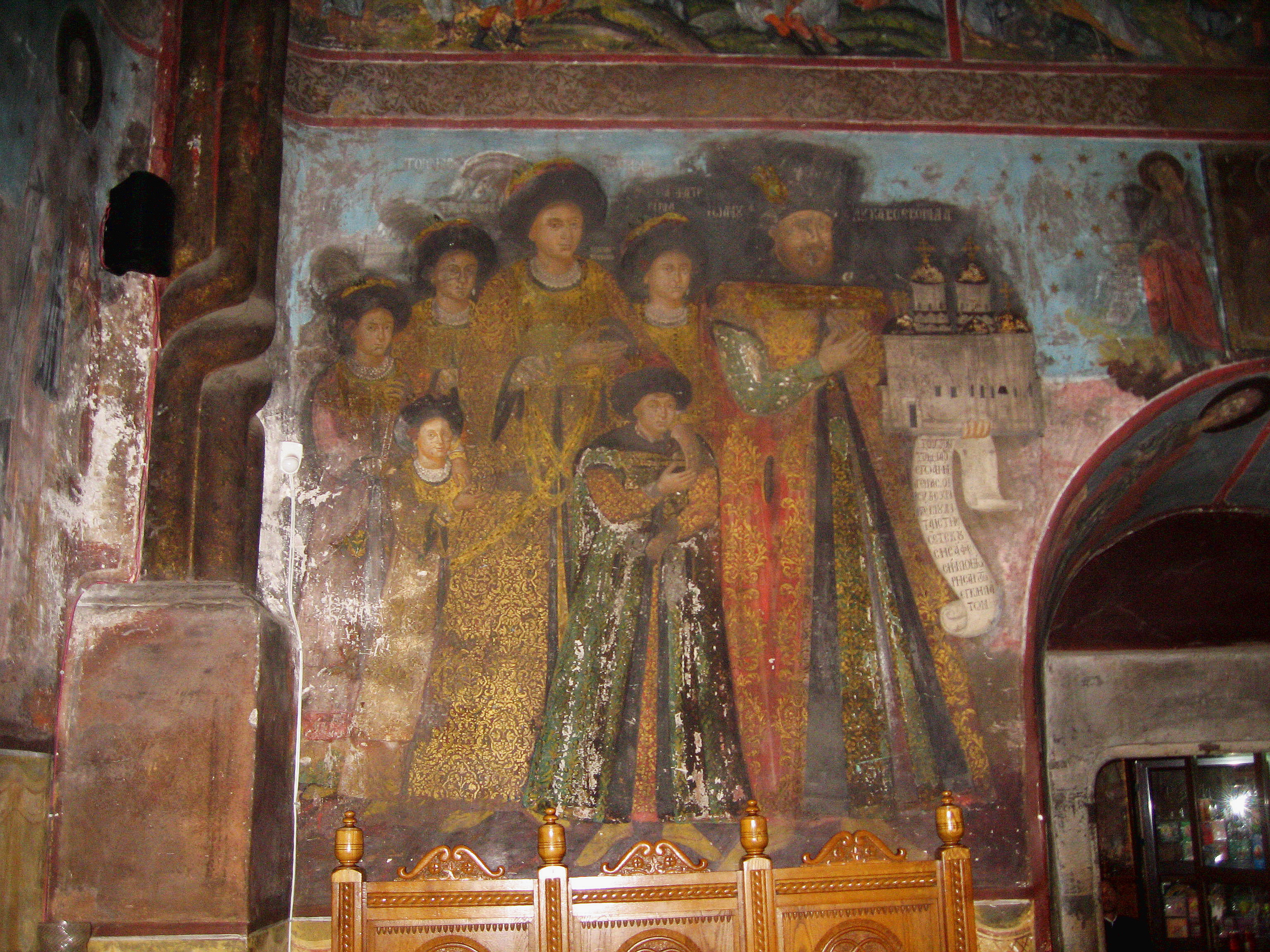
Gheorghe Duca, his wife Anastasia Dabizha and some of their children on a mural of the church.

He contracted large debts in order to reclaim the throne, which he managed to following Iliaș Alexandru's rule. The policy of increased taxation led to the uprising of Mihalcea Hâncu in October 1671, crushed the next year after Ducas received Ottoman help. But, as Ducas failed to provide supplies needed for the War against the Polish–Lithuanian Commonwealth, with the Sultan Mehmed IV's life placed in peril at the attack of Kamianets-Podilskyi, the Ottomans swiftly replaced him with Ștefan Petriceicu.

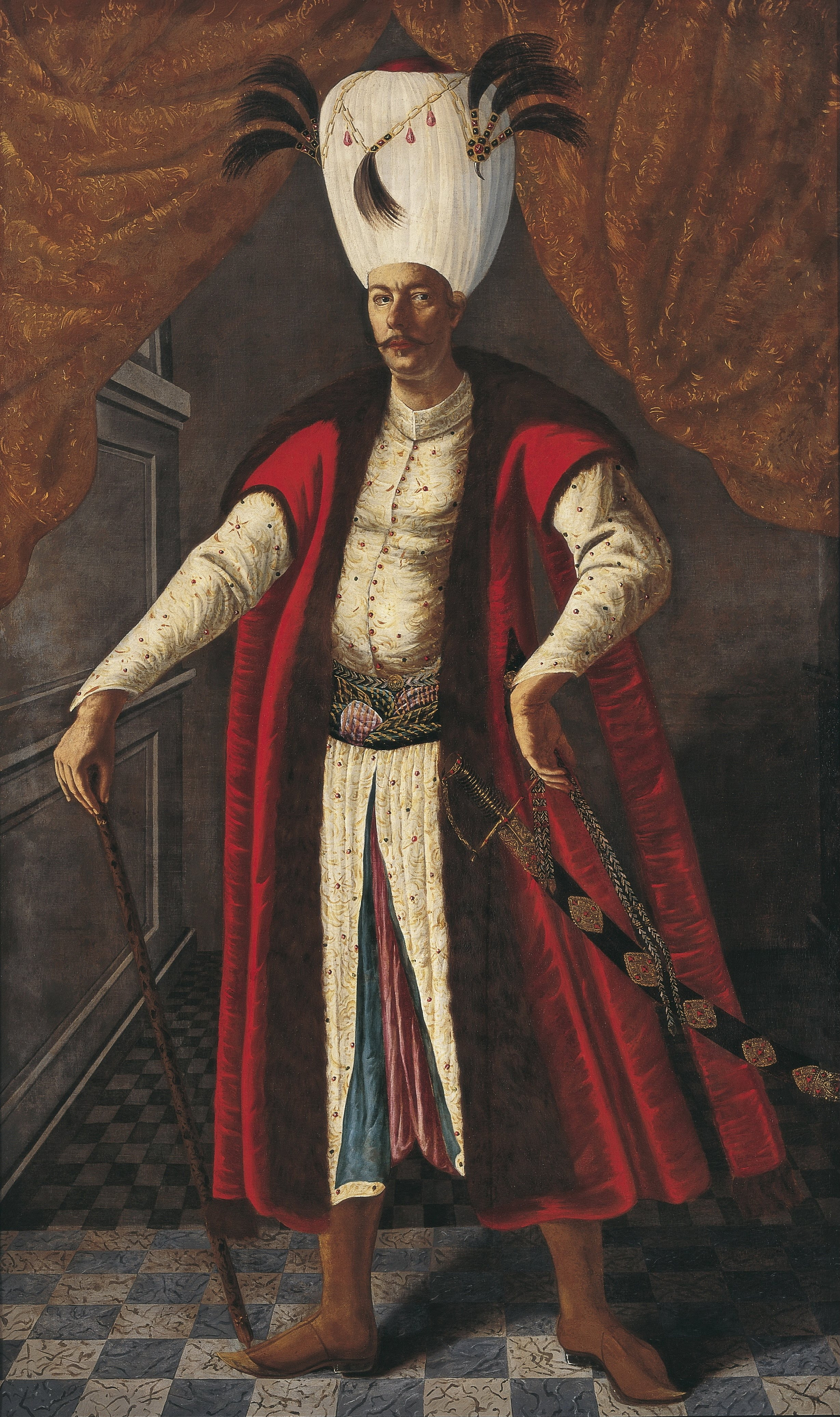
Sultan Mehmed IV, ruler of the Ottoman Empire from 1648 to 1687.

== Rule in Wallachia ==
In 1674, through the intervention of the Cantacuzino boyars, he was awarded the throne in Bucharest; soon however, the alliance between the Cantacuzinos and Ducas crumbled, the prince being replaced by Șerban Cantacuzino.

== Last rule in Moldavia and rule in Right-bank Ukraine ==
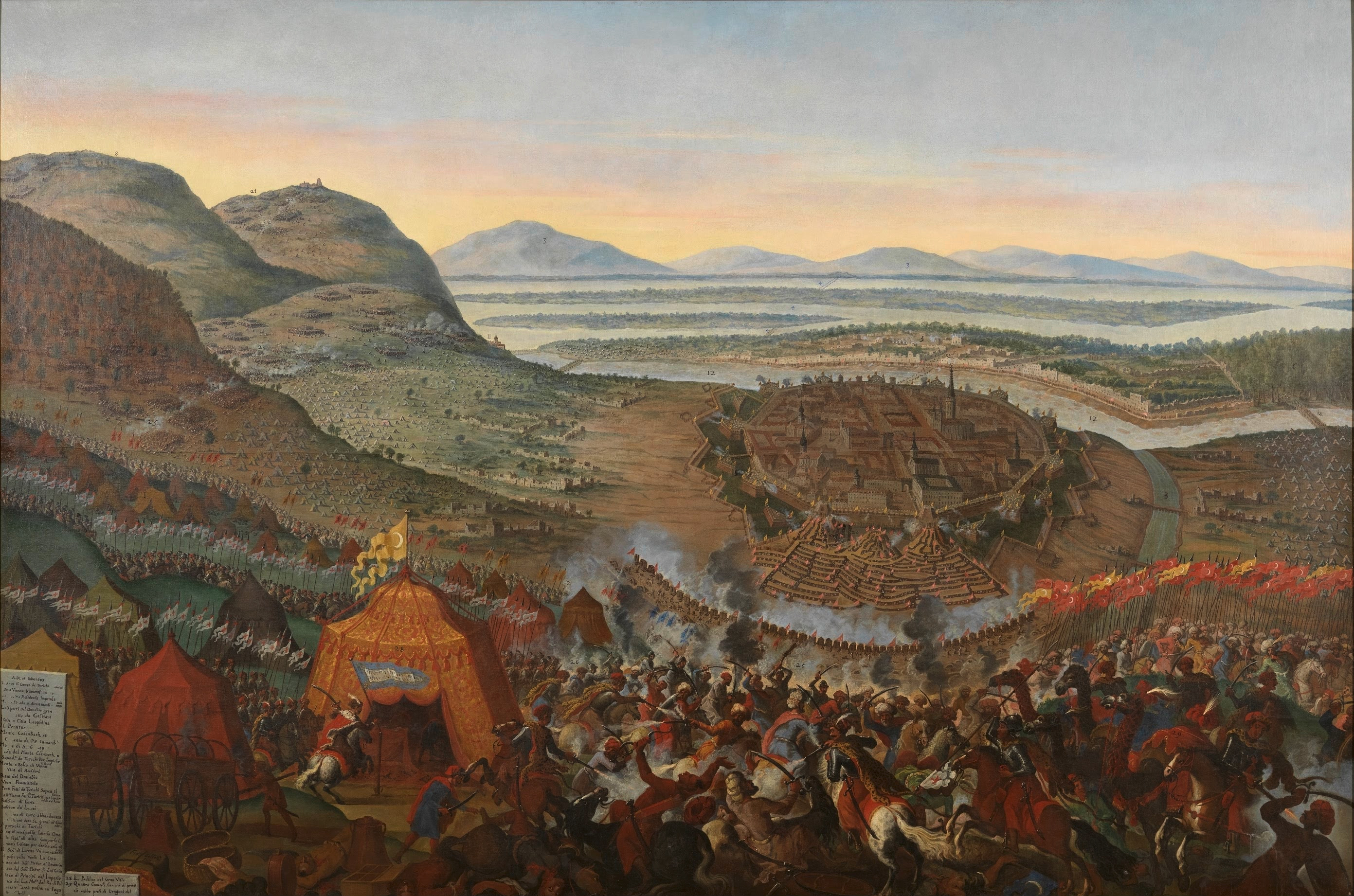
The battle of Vienna in 1683, by Frans Geffels (1625–1694)

He was soon back on the Moldavian throne, following Antonie Ruset (Rosetti)'s reign. George Ducas had plans of extending his rule over right-bank Ukraine, where Ottoman gains had started with the acquisition of Podolia in 1672. His overlord appointed him as hetman over the newly gained regions, in 1680 or 1681, after much bribery strained the Moldavian treasury as much as the request that Ducas had placed on the taxed categories that they contribute to his daughter's dowry.

In 1683, Ducas joined the Ottomans in their march at the Battle of Vienna. Helped by his absence and aware of the complete failure of the Ottoman plans, boyars throughout the land rebelled, following Ștefan Petriceicu's command, and welcomed the invading Poles and Cossacks.

On his way back, Ducas was captured on 25 December 1683 and sent to a prison in Poland, where he died one year later.

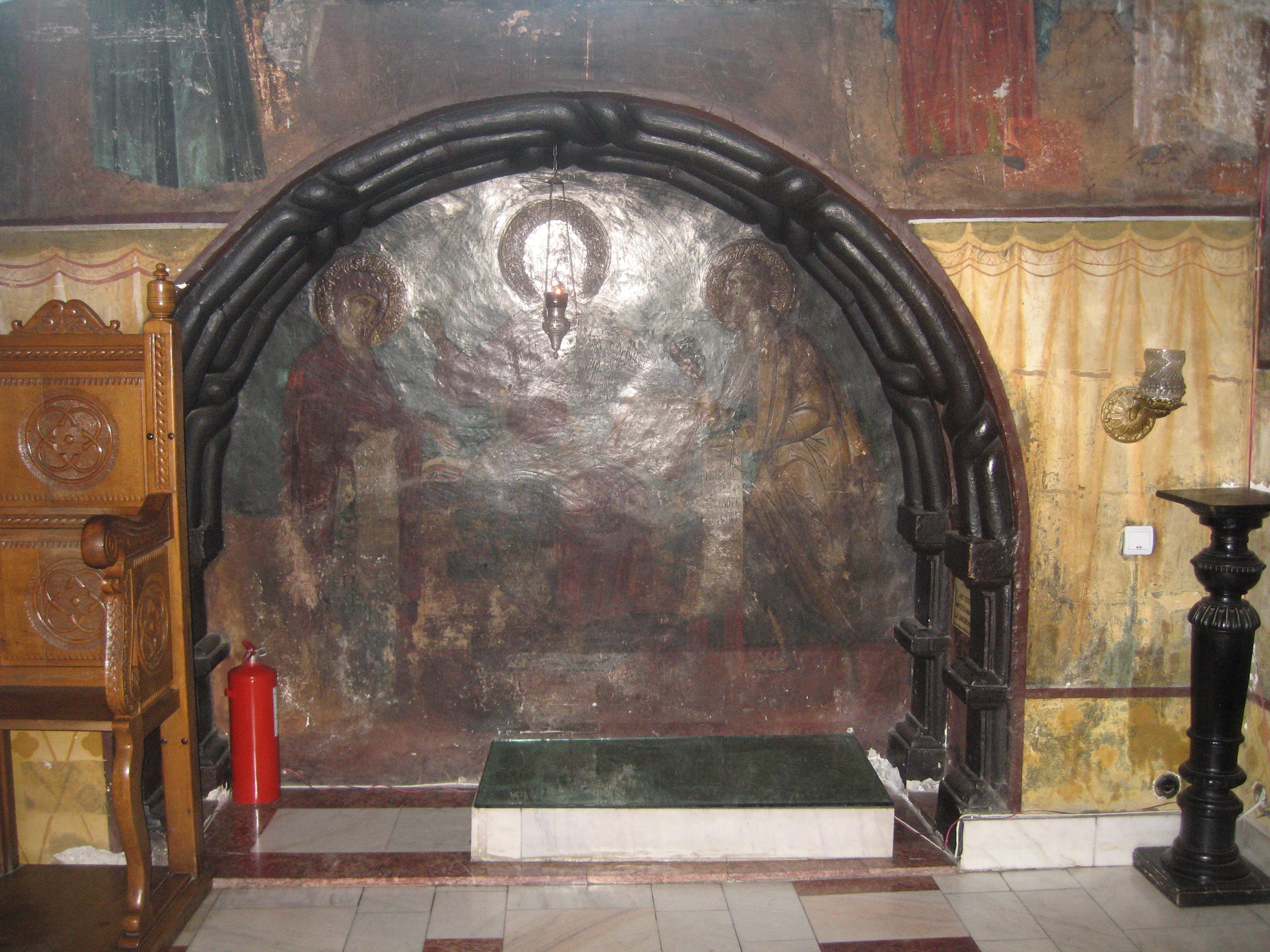
Burial of Prince Gheorghe and his daughter Maria, at the Cetățuia Monastery.

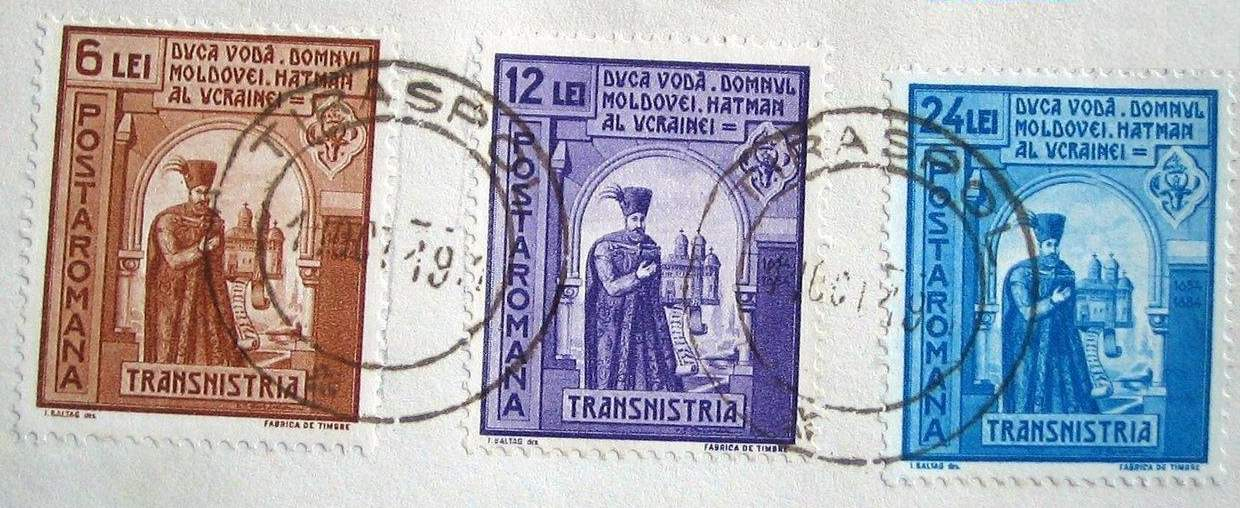
Ducas Voda, Prince of Moldavia and hetman of Ukraine, on Romanian stamps from 1941

== Bibliography ==
- Cernovodeanu, Paul (1982). "Ştiri privitoare la Gheorghe Ghica vodă al Moldovei ( 1658– 1659 ) şi la familia sa (I)". Anuarul Institutului de Istorie și Arheologie "A.D. Xenopol." (in Romanian). 19. Institutul de Istorie și Arheologie "A.D. Xenopol.".
- Wasiucionek, Michal (2012). "Ethnic solidary in the wider Ottoman Empire revisited: cins and local political elites in 17th century Moldavia and Wallachia". In Sariyannis, Marinos (ed.). New Trends in Ottoman Studies: Papers presented at the 20th CIÉPO Symposium Rethymno, 27 June – 1 July 2012. University of Crete – Department of History and Archaeology.
- Wasiucionek, Michal (2016). Politics and Watermelons: Cross-Border Political Networks in the Polish-Moldavian-Ottoman Context in the Seventeenth Century (PDF) (Thesis). European University Institute.

Preceded by Eustratie Dabija	Prince/Voivode of Moldavia; 1665–1666	Succeeded by Iliaș Alexandru
Preceded by Iliaș Alexandru	Prince/Voivode of Moldavia; 1668–1672	Succeeded by Ştefan Petriceicu
Preceded by Antonie Ruset	Prince/Voivode of Moldavia; 1678–1684	Succeeded by Ștefan Petriceicu
Preceded by Grigore I Ghica	Prince/Voivode of Wallachia; 1673–1678	Succeeded by Șerban Cantacuzino
