= Antonie Ruset =

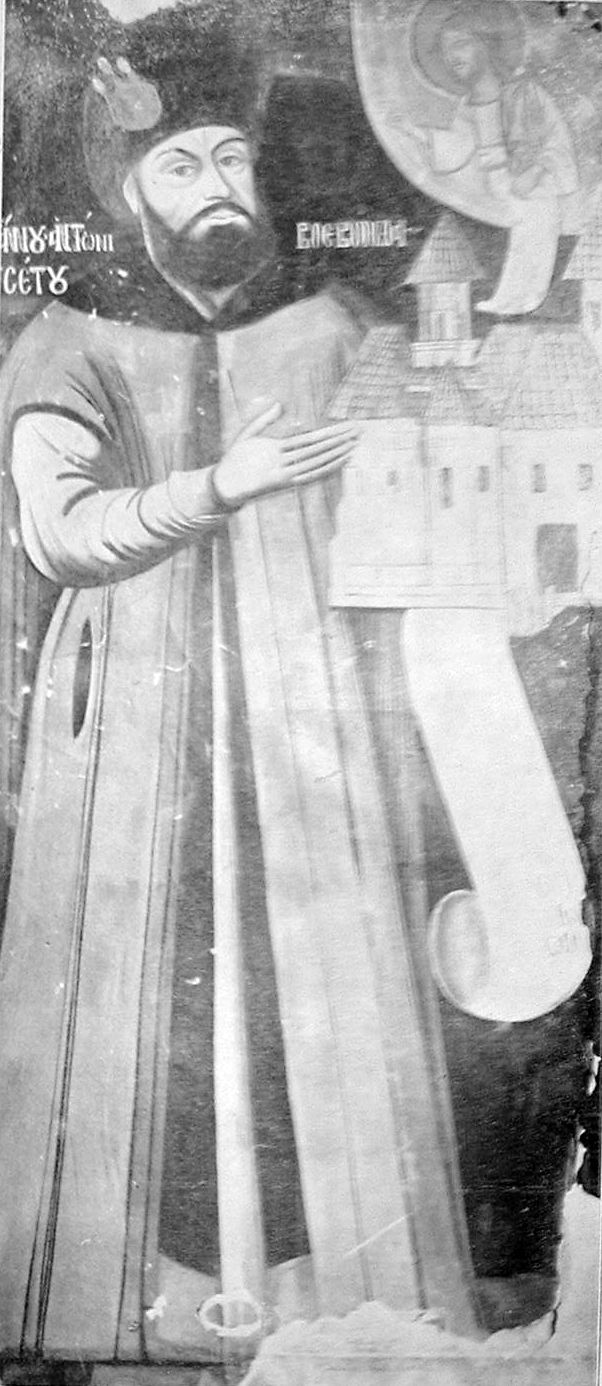
- Ruset at St. Nicholas church in Iaşi

Prince of Moldavia
- Reign: 10 November 1675 – November 1678
- Predecessor: Dumitrașcu Cantacuzino
- Successor: George Ducas
- Born: c. 1615
- Died: 1685
- House: Ruset
- Religion: Orthodox

Antonie Ruset or Antonie Rosetti (c. 1615 – 1685) ruled from November 10, 1675 to November 1678 in the Principality of Moldova.

== Life ==
He came from an ancient family of Byzantine origin. Ruset ordered on March 29, 1677, the relocation of the seat of the Moldovan Metropolitan of the Romanian Orthodox Church from the former princely seat in Suceava to the current capital, Iaşi, since, according to Byzantine custom, both the administrative and the ecclesiastical centre of the empire had to be in the same city.

== Sources ==
- Dimitrie Xenopol: Istoria romanilor din Dacia Traiana, Iași 1891, Bd. IV, S. 327 f

Preceded by Dumitrașcu Cantacuzino	Prince/Voivode of Moldavia; 1675–1678	Succeeded by George Ducas
