= Iliaș Alexandru =

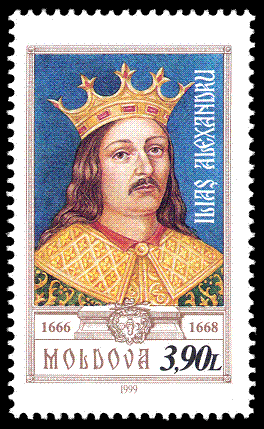
- 1999 stamp of Moldova

Prince of Moldavia
- Reign: 21 May 1666 – 8 November 1668
- Predecessor: George Ducas
- Successor: George Ducas
- Born: ca. 1635
- Died: 1675; Istanbul
- Dynasty: Bogdan-Mușat
- Father: Alexandru Iliaș
- Religion: Orthodox

Iliaș Alexandru (also called Iliaș III), (c. 1635 – 1675) was voivode or Ruler of Moldavia from 1666 to 1668. He was the son of a previous ruler. Gheorghe Duca preceded and reigned after him.

In 1668, he punished Nicolae Milescu who had been plotting against him by having his nose cut off. Milescu was forced to leave to Constantinople.

In 1999, he appeared on a Moldovan stamp.

Preceded by George Ducas	Prince/Voivode of Moldavia; 1666–1668	Succeeded by George Ducas
