= Ștefan Petriceicu =

Voivode of Moldavia

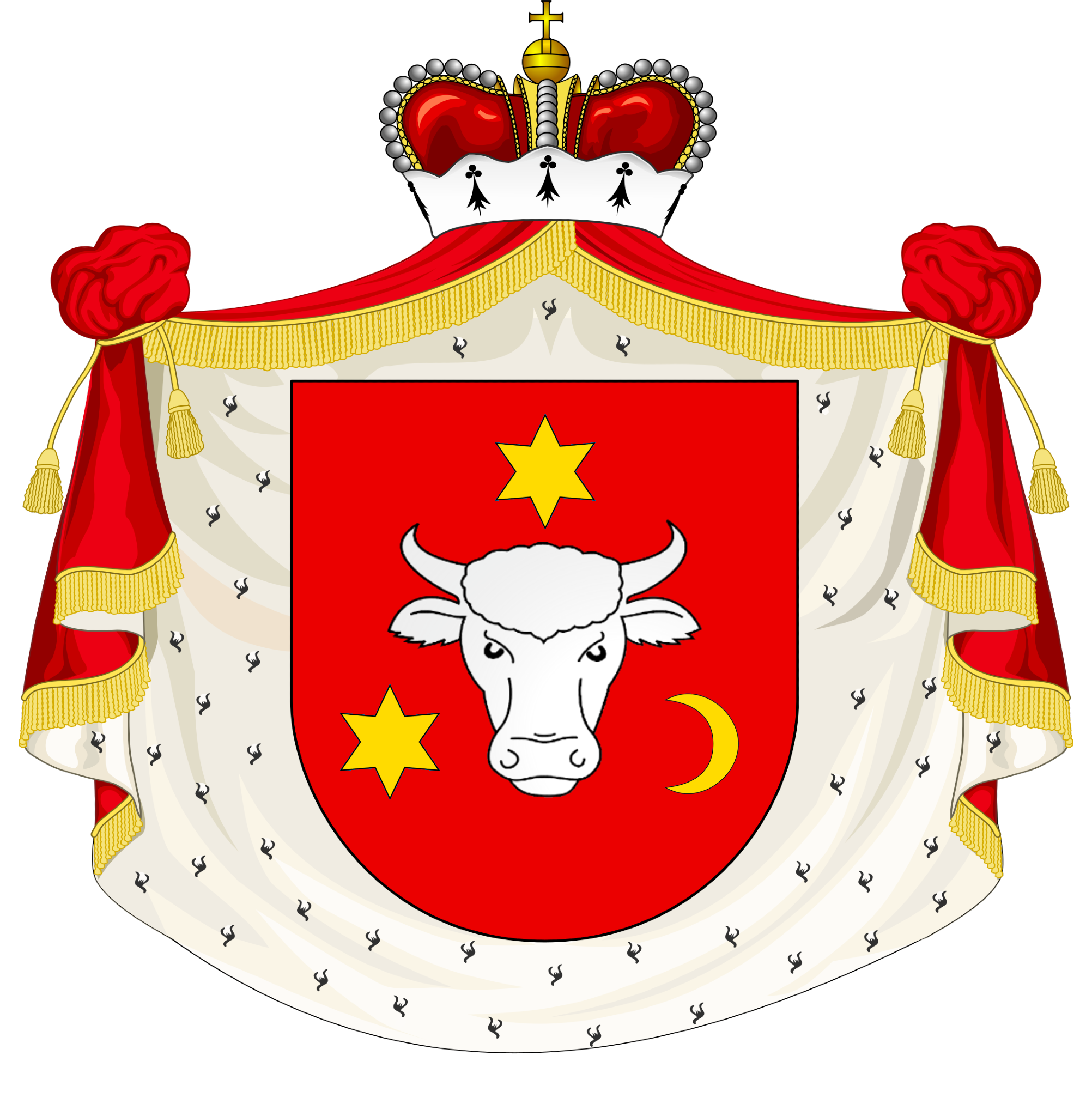

Prince of Moldavia (1st reign)
- Reign: 20 August 1672 – November 1673
- Predecessor: George Ducas
- Successor: Dumitrașcu Cantacuzino

Prince of Moldavia (2nd reign)
- Reign: December 1673 – 22 February 1674
- Predecessor: Dumitrașcu Cantacuzino
- Successor: Dumitrașcu Cantacuzino

Prince of Moldavia (3rd reign)
- Reign: 25 December 1683 – March 1684
- Predecessor: George Ducas
- Successor: Dumitrașcu Cantacuzino
- Born: before 1663
- Died: 1690
- Father: Toader Petriceicu
- Religion: Orthodox

Ștefan Petriceicu (Romanian: Ștefan al XI-lea Petriceicu, died 1690) was three times Voivode of Moldavia (August 1672 – November 1673, December 1673 – February 1674, December 1683 – March 1684).

== Reign ==
The son of a boyar, Chancellor (mare logofăt) Toader Petriceicu (d. 1663), Ștefan was elected by the nobility – with the approval of the Ottoman Empire – to succeed George Ducas in 1672. The Ottomans forced Petriceicu to support their campaign against Poland at the Battle of Khotyn in 1673, but later ousted him for siding with the Poles in November 1673. He returned to power briefly before Dimitrie Cantacuzino replaced him a second time in February the following year. Having retaken power once again from George Ducas in December 1683, the Ottomans eventually replaced Petriceicu permanently with Cantacuzino in March 1684.

Preceded by George Ducas	Prince/Voivode of Moldavia; 1672–1673	Succeeded by Dumitrașcu Cantacuzino
Preceded by Dumitrașcu Cantacuzino	Prince/Voivode of Moldavia; 1673–1674	Succeeded by Dumitrașcu Cantacuzino
Preceded by George Ducas	Prince/Voivode of Moldavia; 1683–1684	Succeeded by Dumitrașcu Cantacuzino
