= Dumitrașcu Cantacuzino =

Moldavian royalty (1620-1686)

Prince of Moldavia (1st reign)
- Reign: November 1673
- Predecessor: Ștefan Petriceicu
- Successor: Ștefan Petriceicu

Prince of Moldavia (2nd reign)
- Reign: February 1674 – 10 November 1675
- Predecessor: Ștefan Petriceicu
- Successor: Antonie Ruset

Prince of Moldavia (3rd reign)
- Reign: 8 February 1684 – 25 June 1685
- Predecessor: Ștefan Petriceicu
- Successor: Constantin Cantemir
- Born: c. 1620
- Died: 1686; Istanbul
- Spouse: Ruxandra Grillo
- Issue: Cassandra, Elena
- House: Cantacuzino family
- Father: Mihai Cantacuzino
- Religion: Orthodox

Dumitrașcu Cantacuzino (c. 1620 – 1686) was Prince of Moldavia 1673, 1674 to 1675, and 1684 to 1685.

== Life ==
Dumitrașcu Cantacuzino was the son of the Grand Treasurer (Marele Vistiernic) Michael Kantakouzenos (in Romanian Mihai Cantacuzino) and the great-grandson of Michael Kantakouzenos Şeytanoğlu (in Romanian Mihai Cantacuzino Șaitanoglu), executed in 1578.

In 1663 he betrayed his kinsman and benefactor Constantine Kantakouzenos in favor of Grigore I Ghica. He is then named three times to the throne of Moldavia by the Turks:

- from November 1673 to February 1674, when he seized the throne at the head of an army of 20,000 Tatars who took advantage of it to ravage the country;
- in November 1675;
- from February 8, 1684 to June 25, 1685; in the following July he was definitively driven out of the country with the support of Șerban Cantacuzino, Prince of Wallachia, by his own general Constantin Cantemir, whom he had falsely denounced as a traitor to the Ottomans.

Dumitrașcu Cantacuzino fled to Constantinople where he lived until his death in 1686. He is, in Romanian and Moldavian history, the prototype of the "phanariote profiteur" who founded neither school nor hospice, only ruled 'for its exclusive benefit, acts unscrupulously and impoverishes the country.

From his union with a princess Roxandra he left three children including:

- Cassandra, first wife of Nicholas Mavrocordatos around 1700.

== Sources ==
- Alexandru Dimitrie Xenopol Histoire des Roumains de la Dacie trajane : Depuis les origines jusqu'à l'union des principautés. E Leroux Paris (1896)
- Nicolas Iorga Histoire des Roumains et de la romanité orientale. (1920)
- (in Romanian) Constantin C. Giurescu & Dinu C. Giurescu, Istoria Românilor Volume III (depuis 1606), Editura Științifică și Enciclopedică, București, 1977.
- Mihail Dimitri Sturdza, Dictionnaire historique et généalogique des grandes familles de Grèce, d'Albanie et de Constantinople, M.-D. Sturdza, Paris, chez l'auteur, 1983 ASIN B0000EA1ET.
- Jean-Michel Cantacuzène, Mille ans dans les Balkans, Éditions Christian, Paris, 1992. ISBN 2-86496-054-0
- Gilles Veinstein, Les Ottomans et la mort (1996) ISBN 9004105050.
- Joëlle Dalegre Grecs et Ottomans 1453-1923. De la chute de Constantinople à la fin de l'Empire Ottoman, L'Harmattan Paris (2002) ISBN 2747521621.
- Jean Nouzille La Moldavie, Histoire tragique d'une région européenne, Ed. Bieler (2004), ISBN 2-9520012-1-9.
- Traian Sandu, Histoire de la Roumanie, Perrin (2008).

Preceded by Ștefan Petriceicu	Prince/Voivode of Moldavia; 1673	Succeeded by Ștefan Petriceicu
Preceded by Ștefan Petriceicu	Prince/Voivode of Moldavia; 1674–1675	Succeeded by Antonie Ruset
Preceded by Ștefan Petriceicu	Prince/Voivode of Moldavia; 1684–1685	Succeeded by Constantin Cantemir
