= Cetățuia Monastery =

Heritage site in Iași, Romania

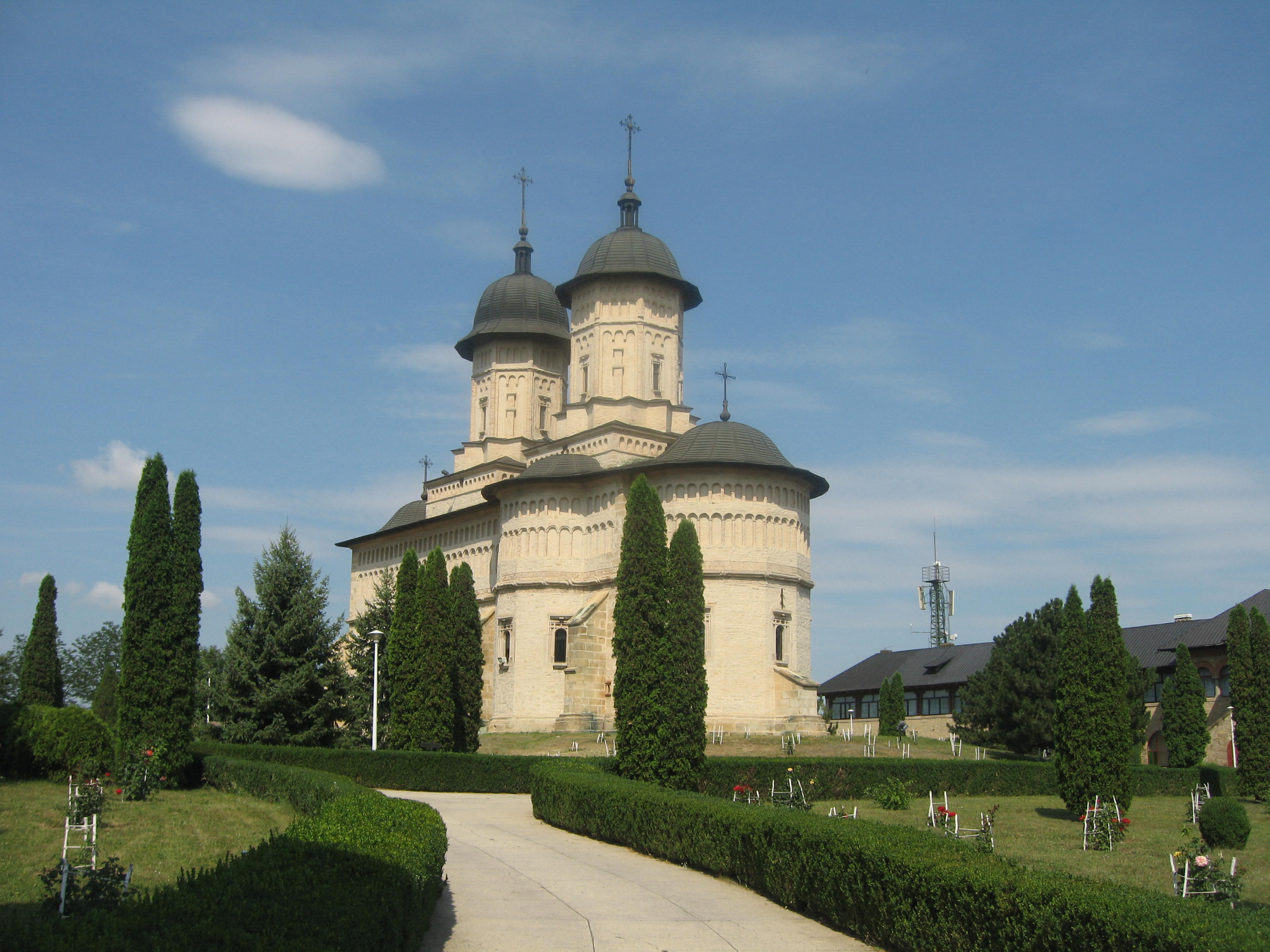

Religion
- Affiliation: Romanian Orthodox Church

Location
- Location: Strada Cetățuia, nr. 1, Iași
- Country: Romania
- Interactive map of Cetățuia Monastery
- Coordinates: 47.1314776°N 27.5839647°E

Architecture
- Style: Moldavian
- Groundbreaking: 1669
- Completed: 1672
- Materials: stone, brick

The Cetățuia Monastery (Romanian: Mănăstirea Cetățuia) is a Romanian Orthodox monastery located at 1 Cetățuia Street in Iași, Romania. The monastery is listed in the National Register of Historic Monuments.

== History ==
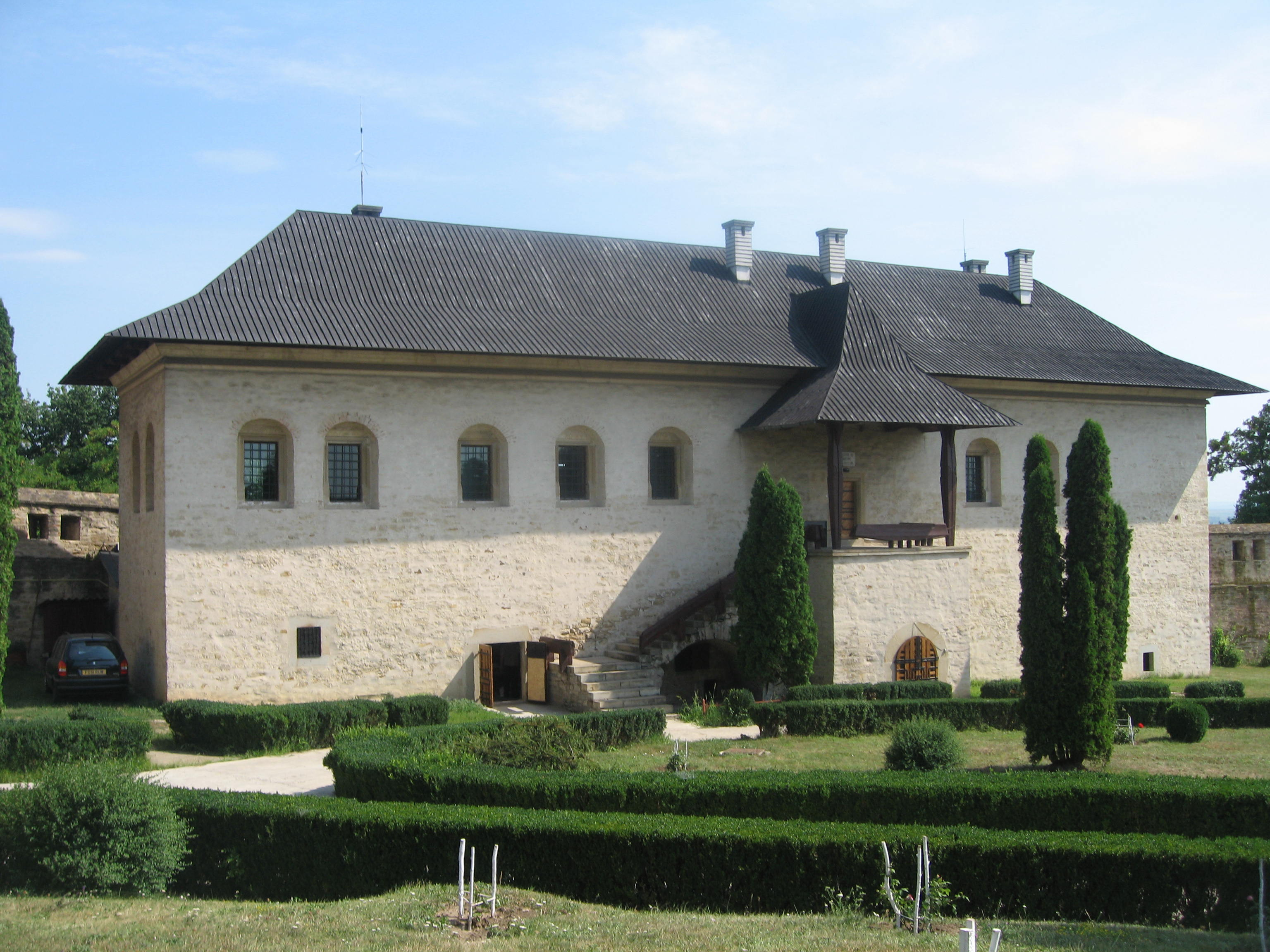
The prince's palace

Located on the top of Cetățuia Hill of the old Moldavian capital, the monastery was built by Prince Gheorghe Duca in the 17th century.

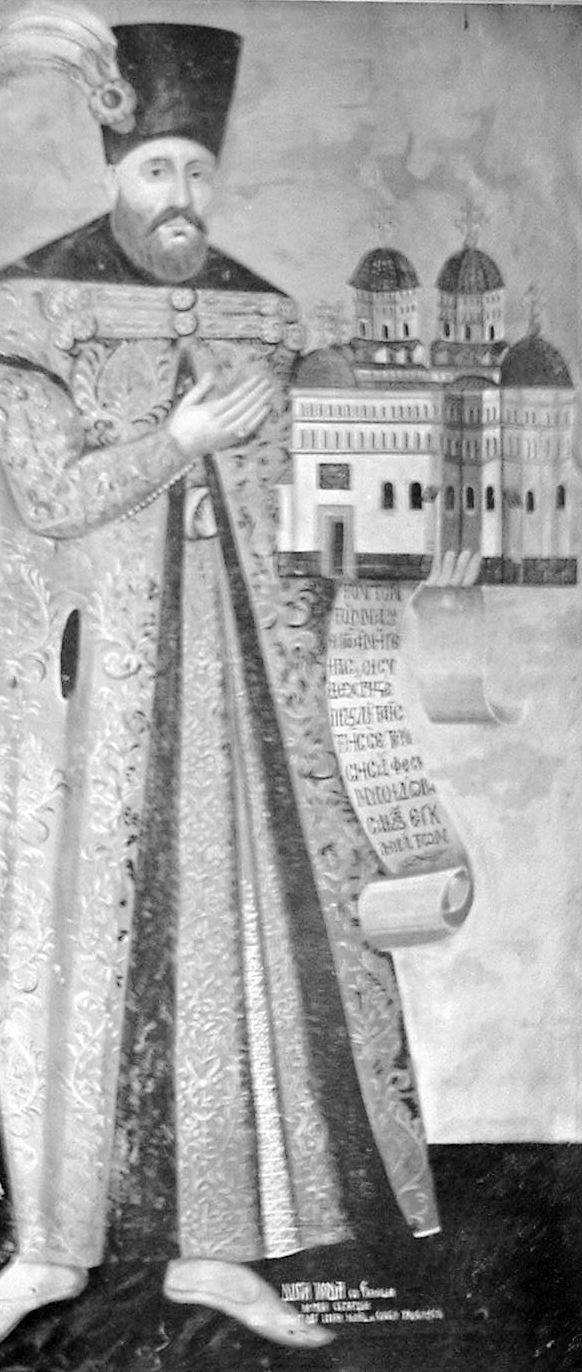
Prince Gheorghe Duca on a mural of the monastery, holding in his hand a model of the building.

The monastery is surrounded by fortifications with towers on the corners. In the past, it provided refuge during enemy siege or full-scale invasions. The name itself, Cetățuia, means citadel or fortress in Romanian.

The uniqueness of Cetățuia Monastery consists in the fact that the entire ensemble of monastic architecture has been preserved.

A special place is the palace destined to the lodging of the prince, a fortified building characteristic to the 17th century and the kitchen or, according to other opinions, the hammam (bathhouse) , which is the only construction of this kind that has been preserved within a monastic ensemble.

In addition there is also a gothic hall, a museum of medieval art, a tower called "Pilgrim’s Dinner", from where one can admire the panorama of Iași and its famous wine cellars with wine obtained from its own vineyard.

== Gallery ==
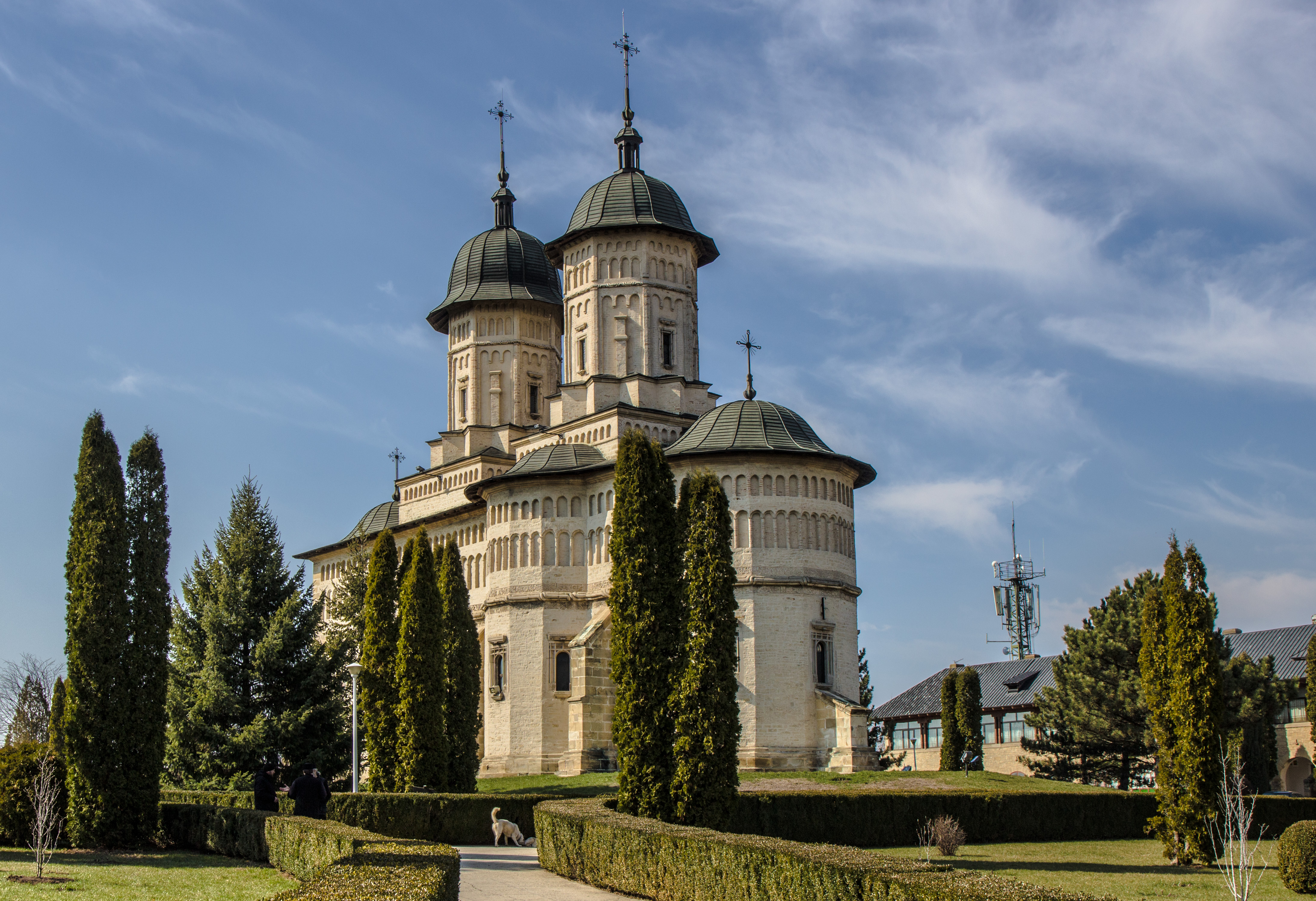

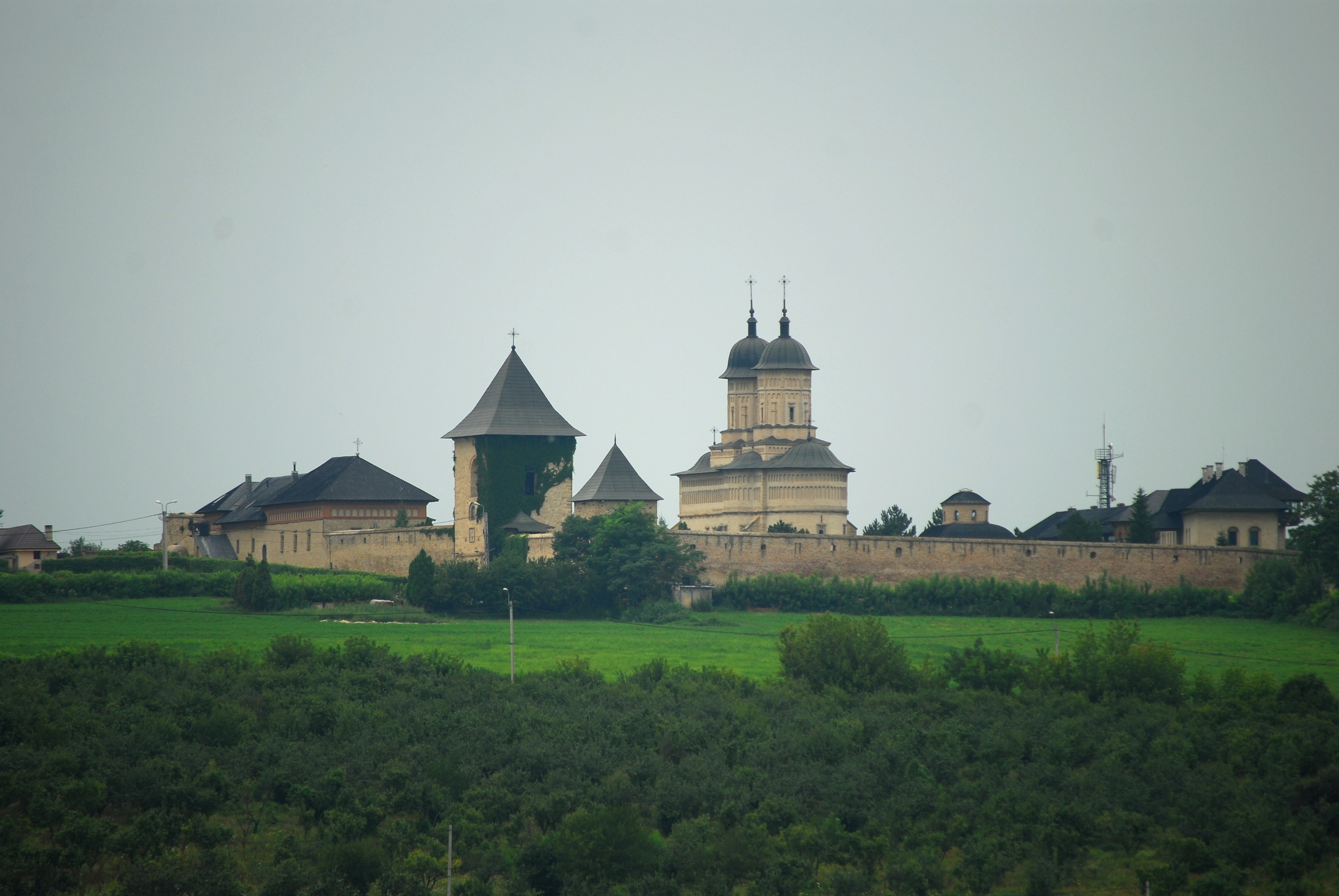

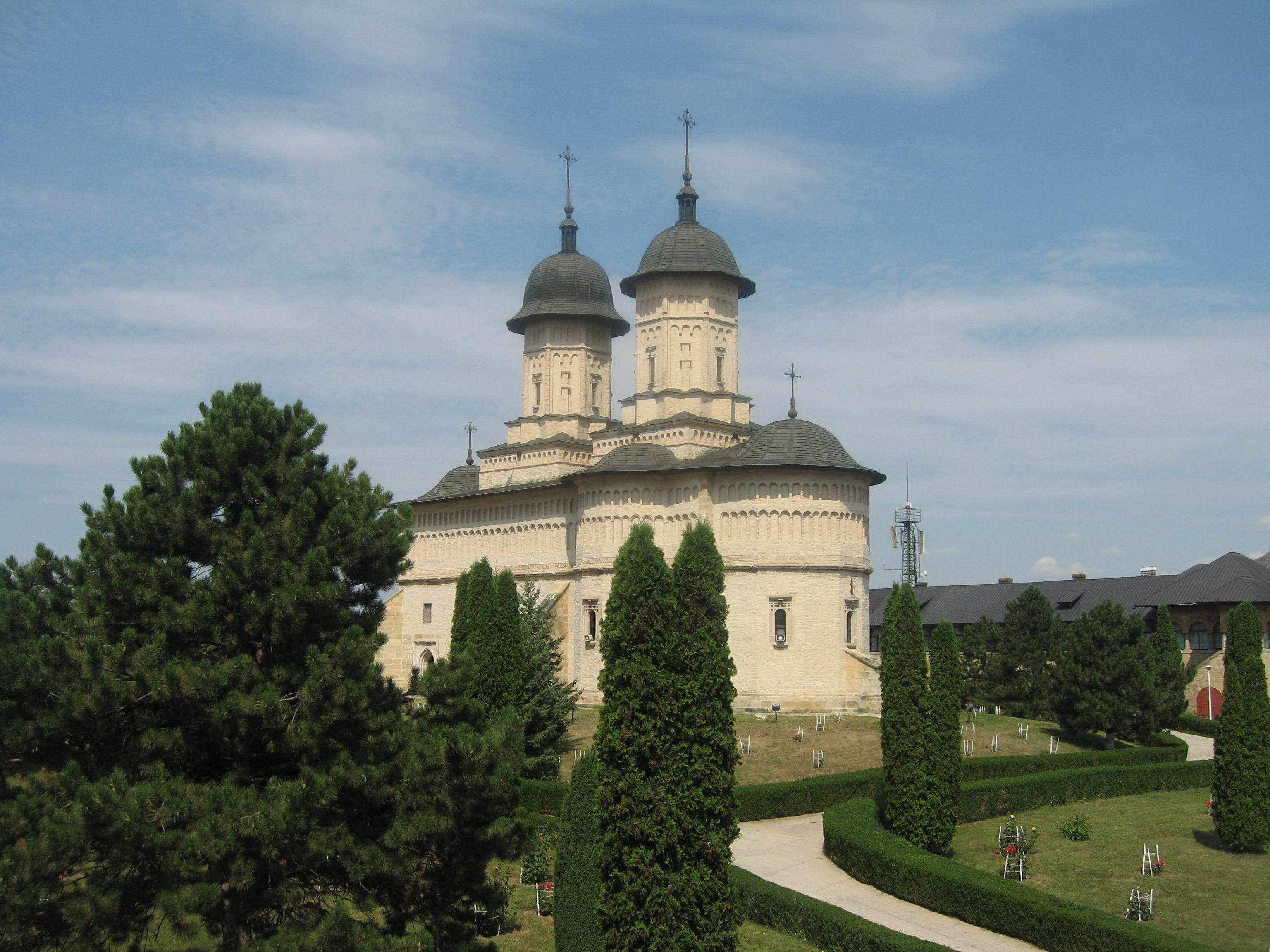

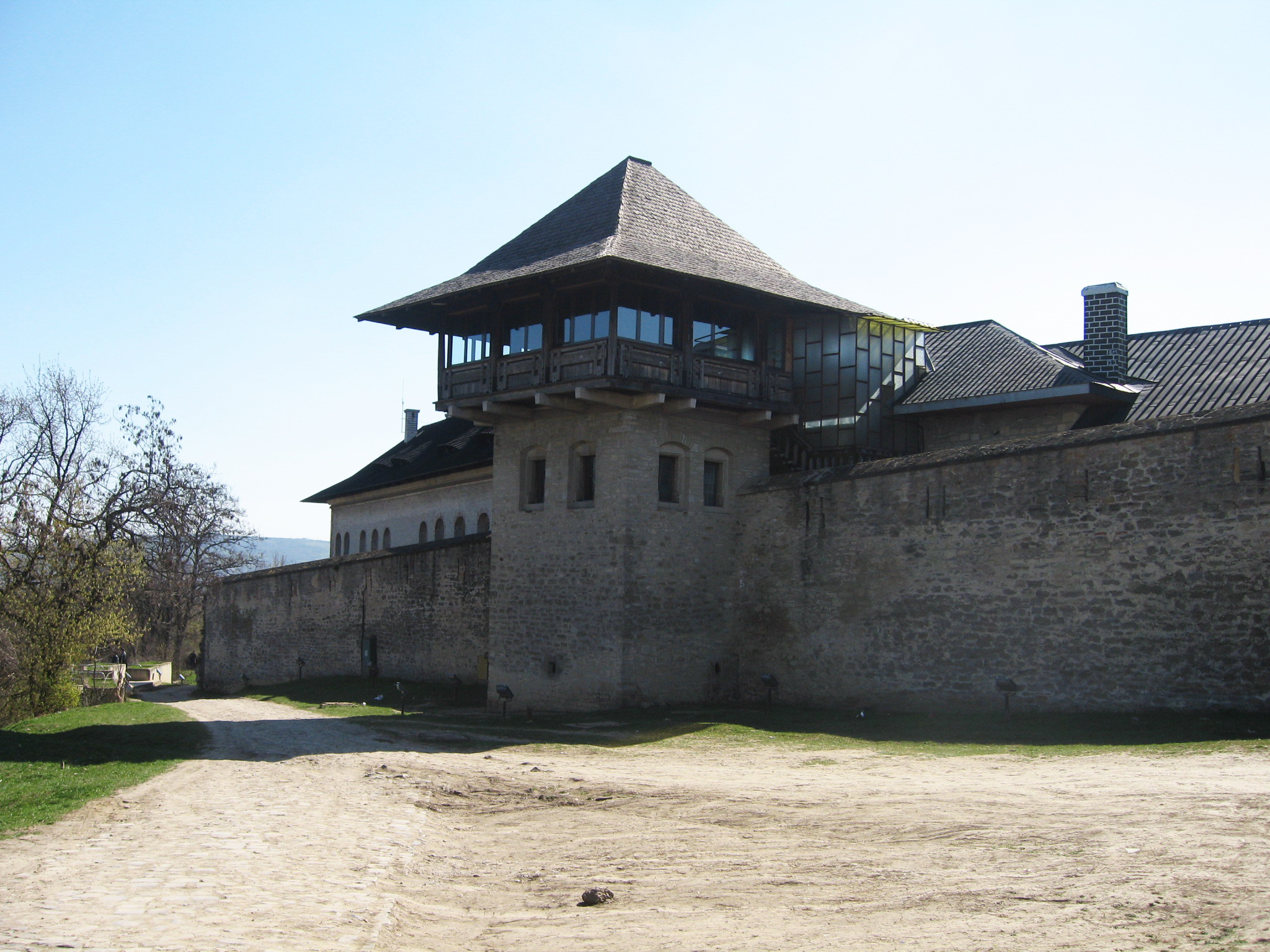

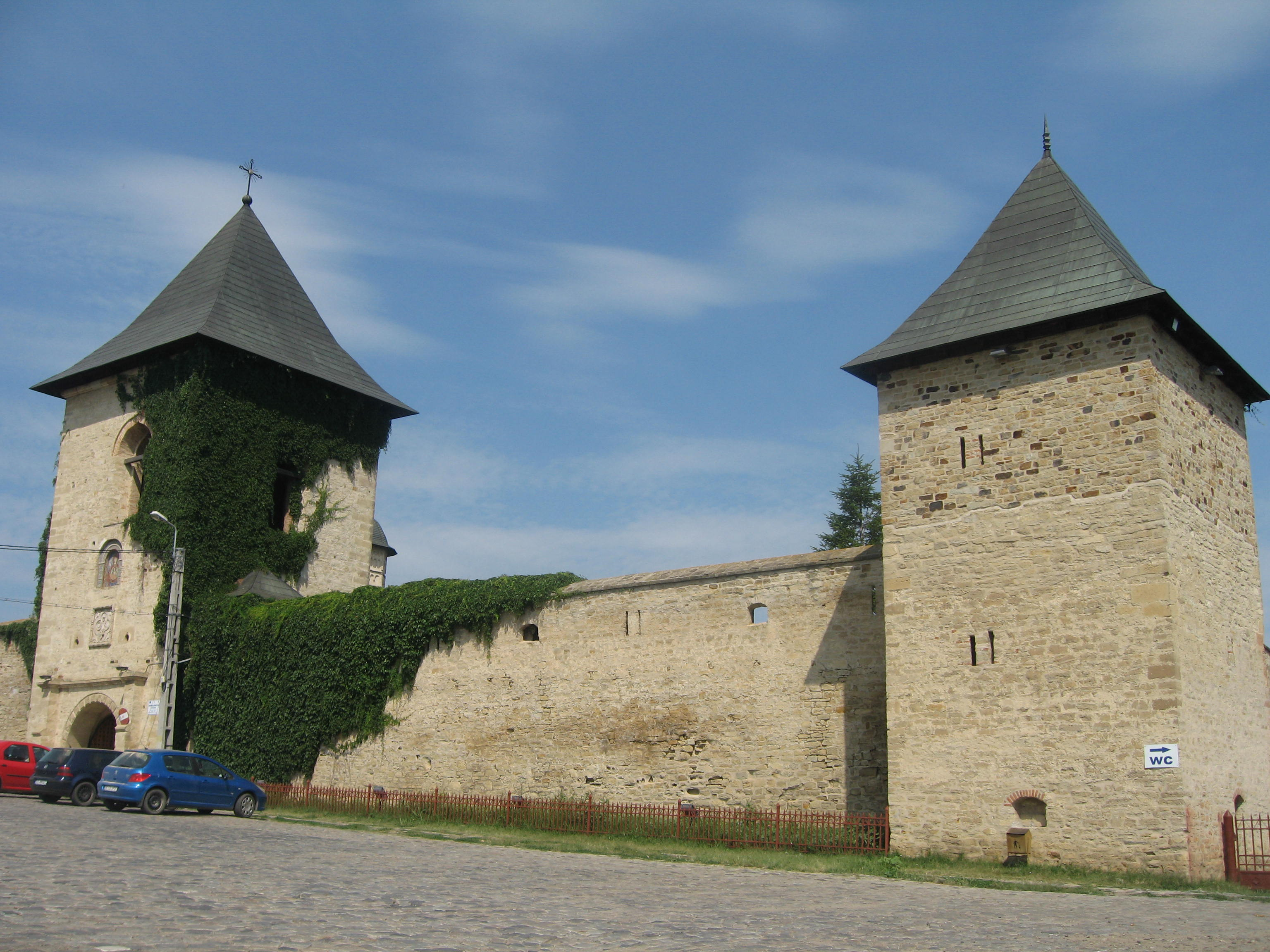

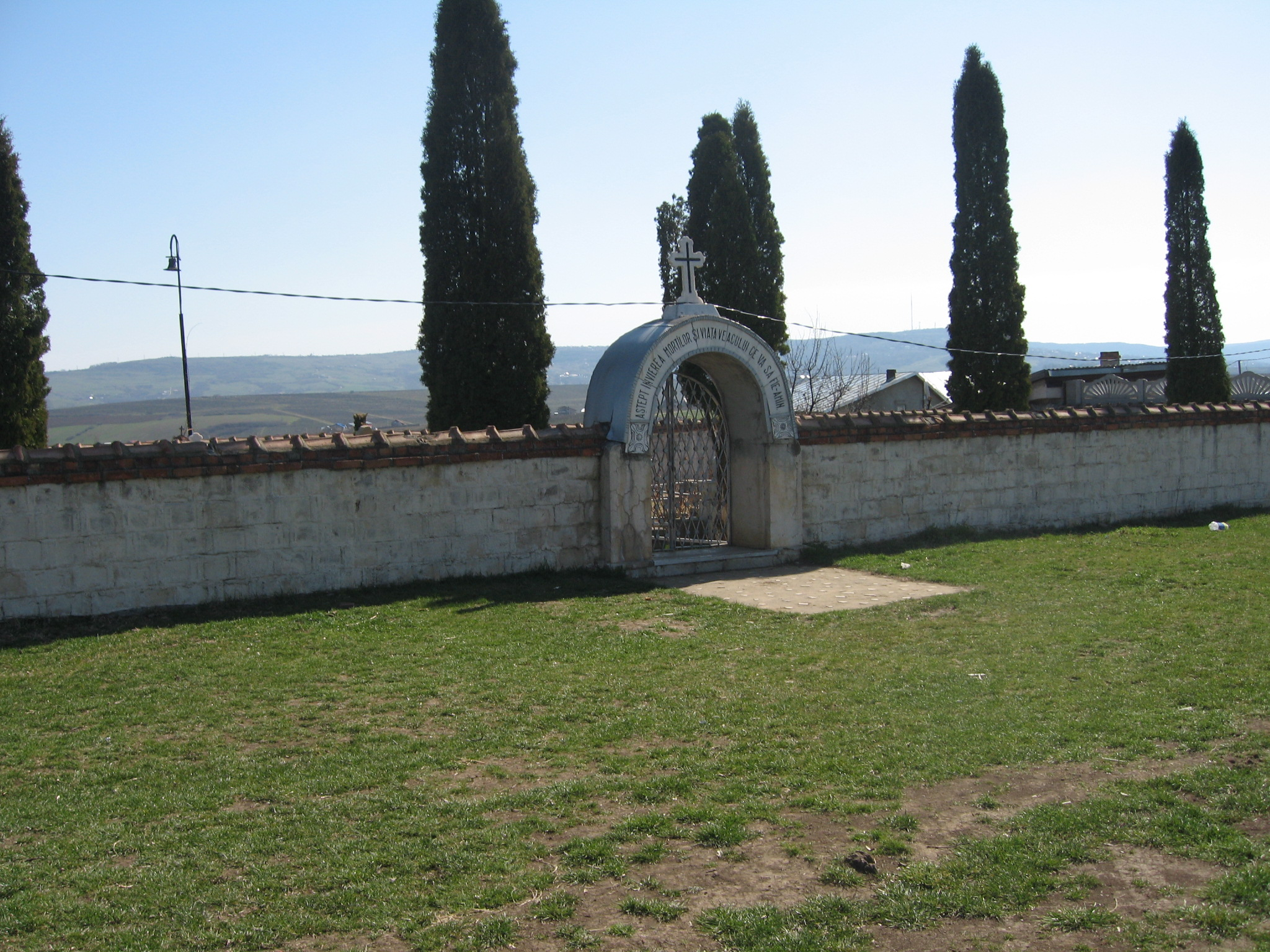

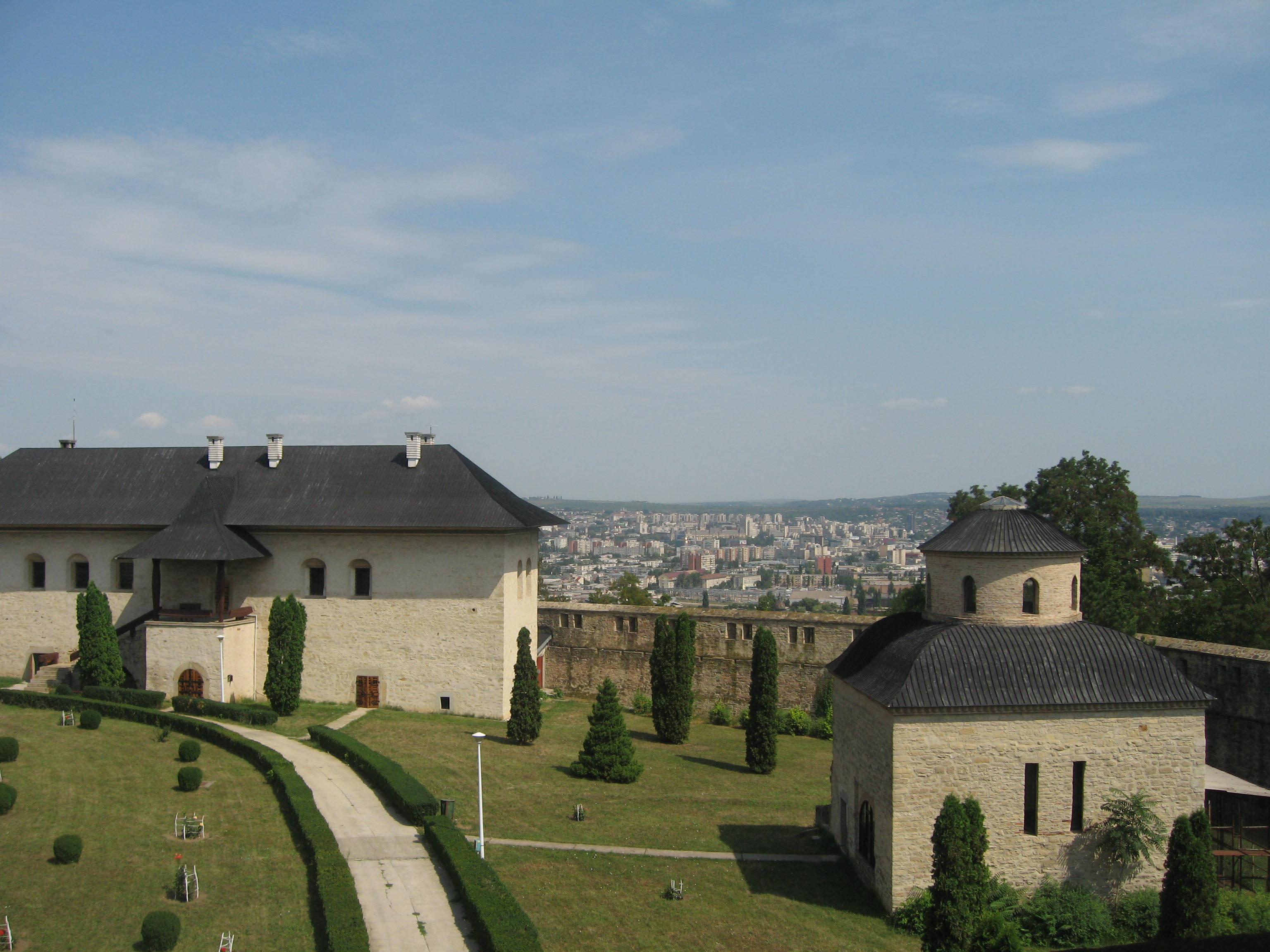

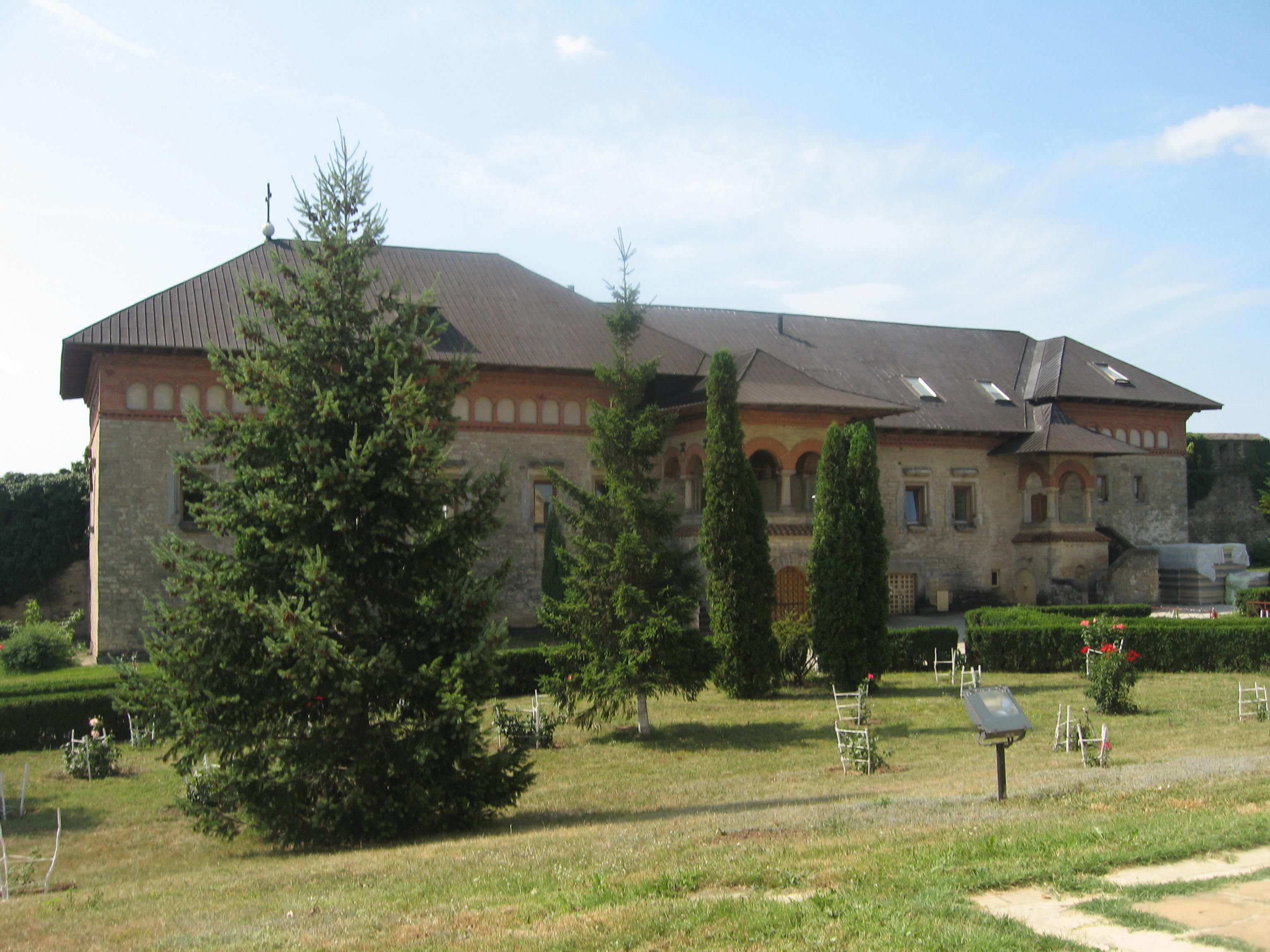

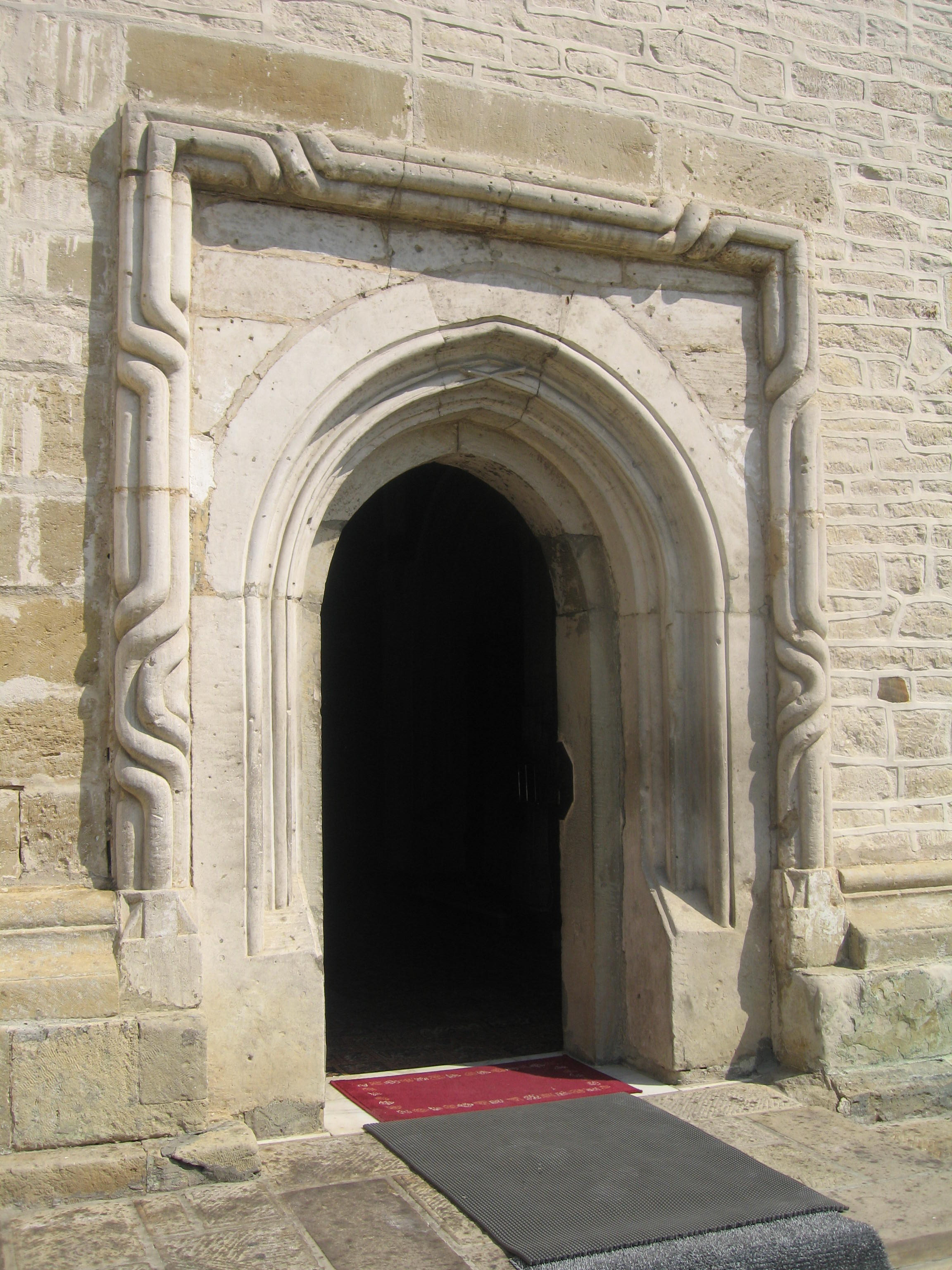

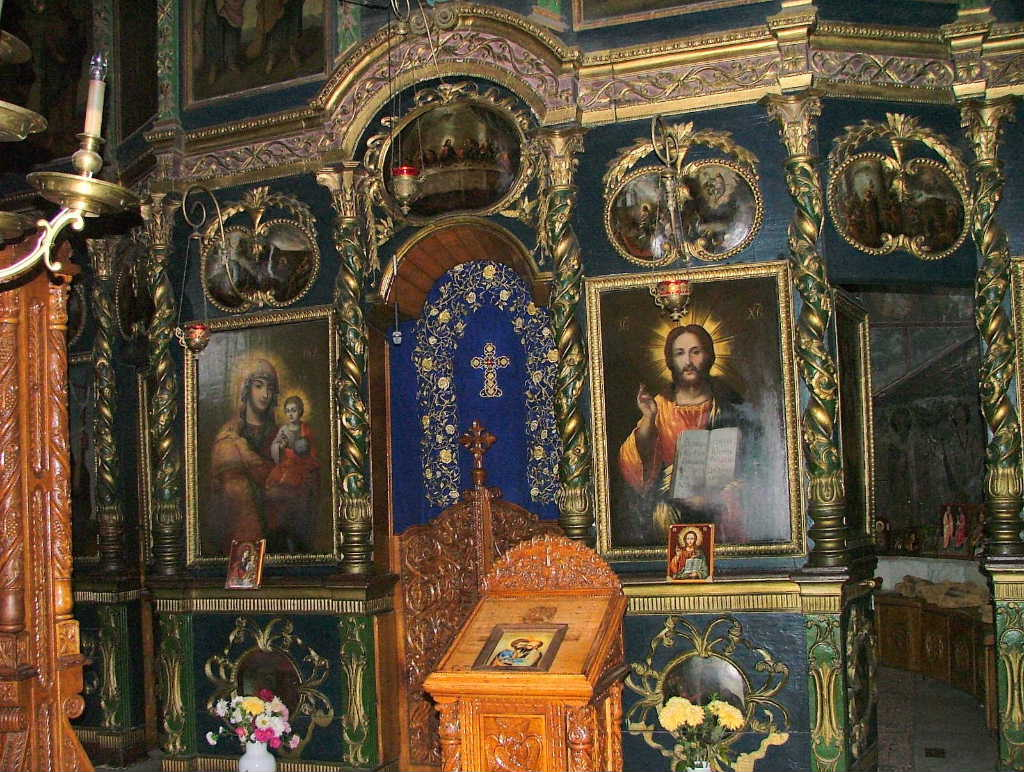

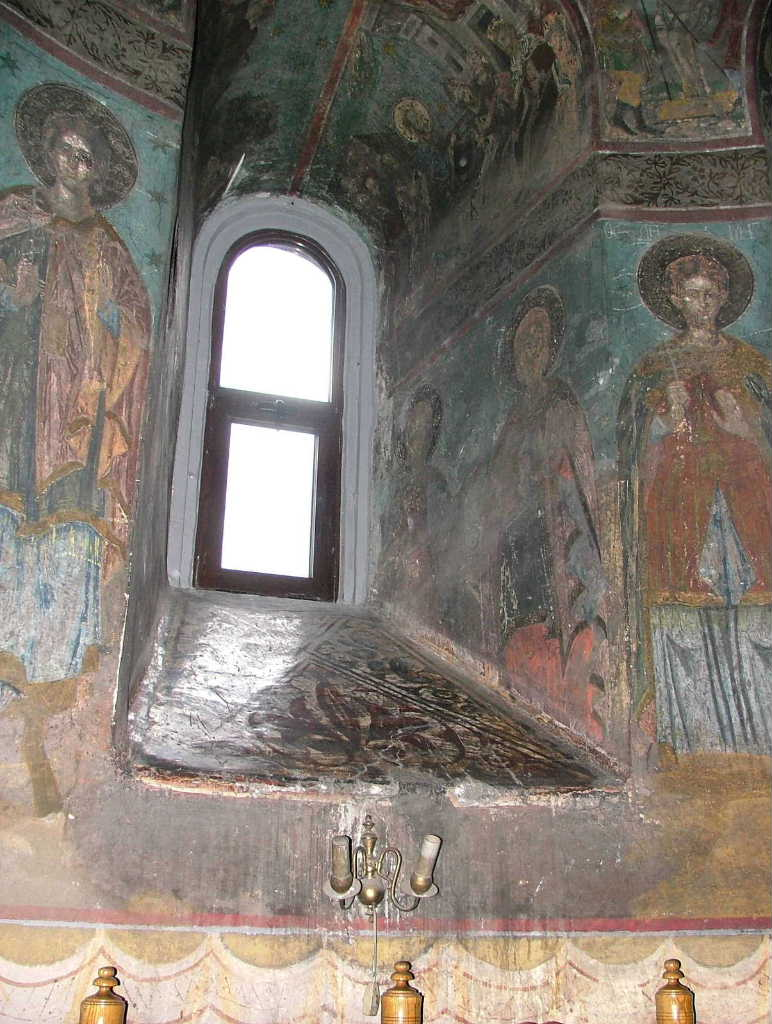

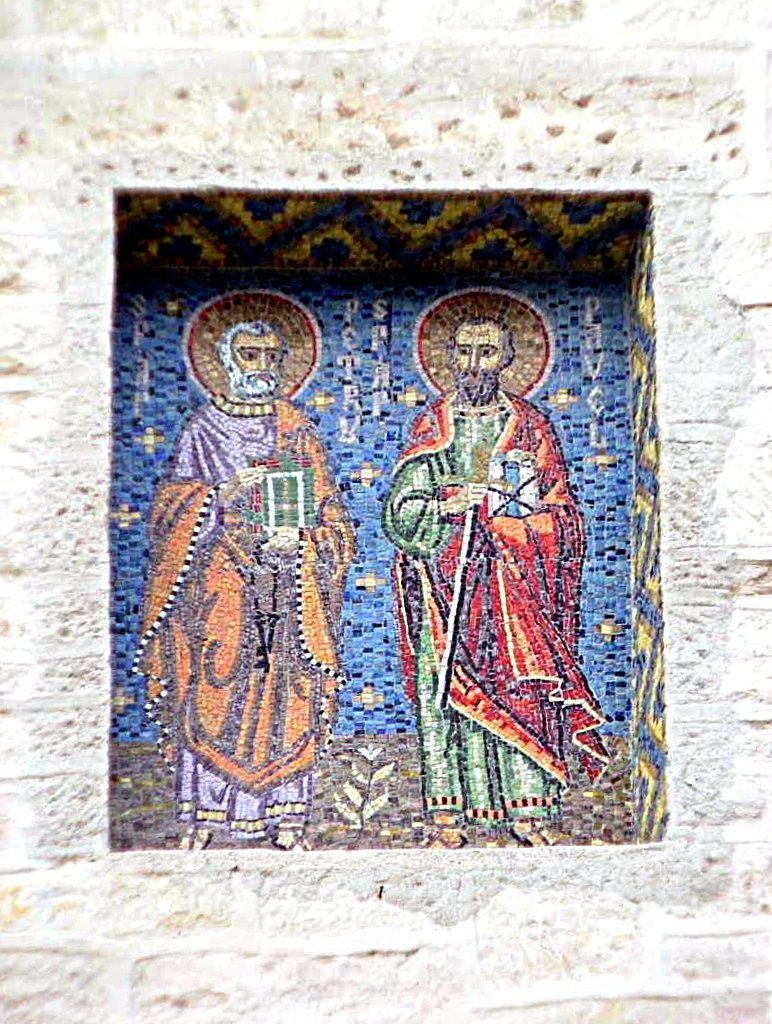

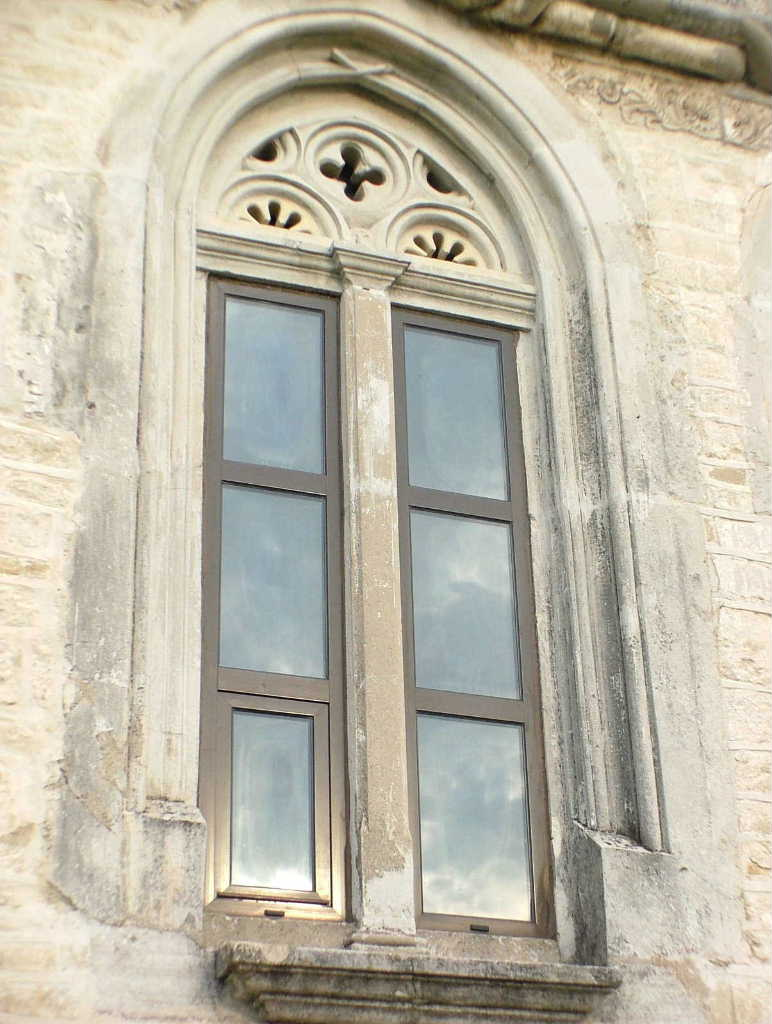

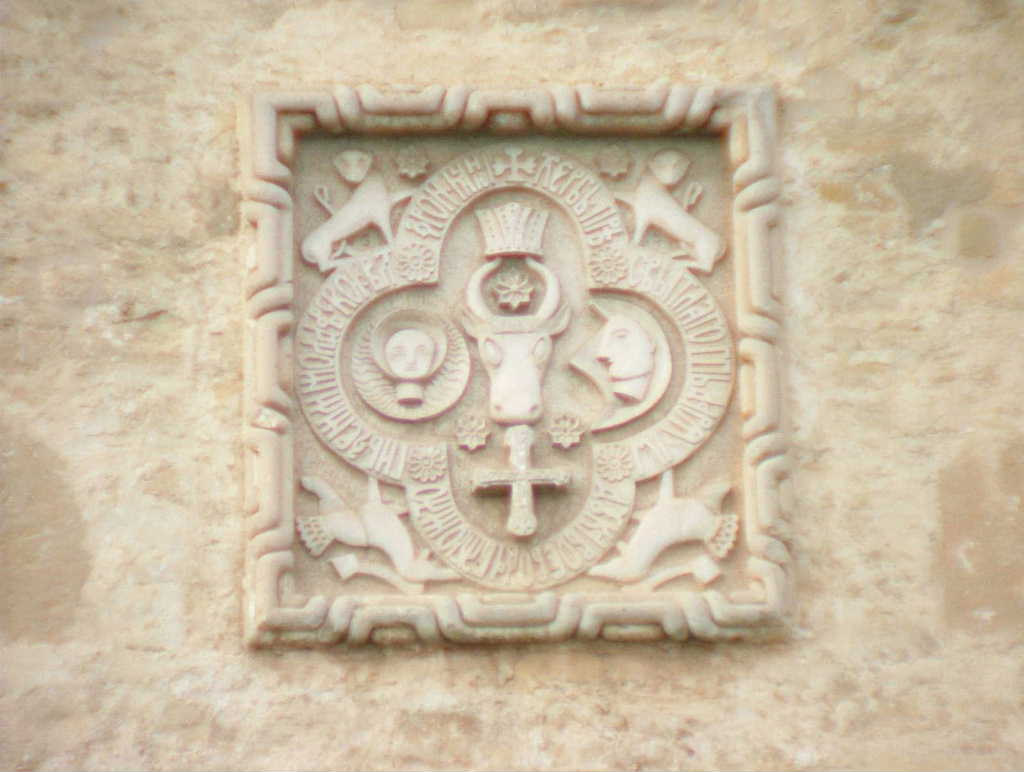

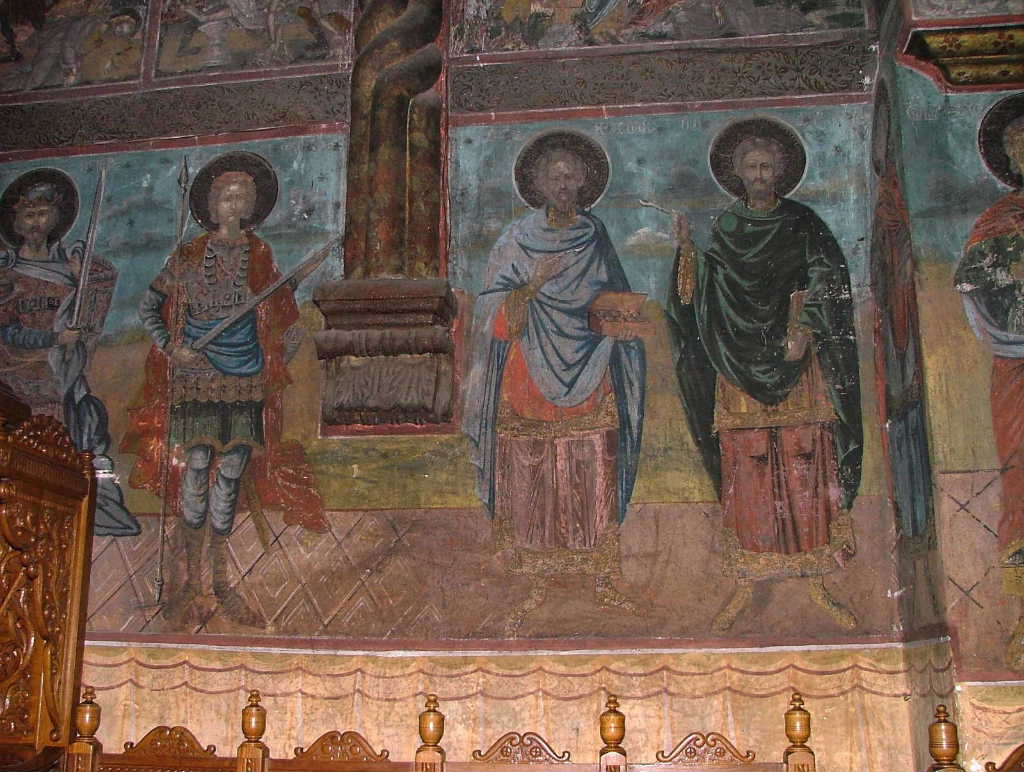

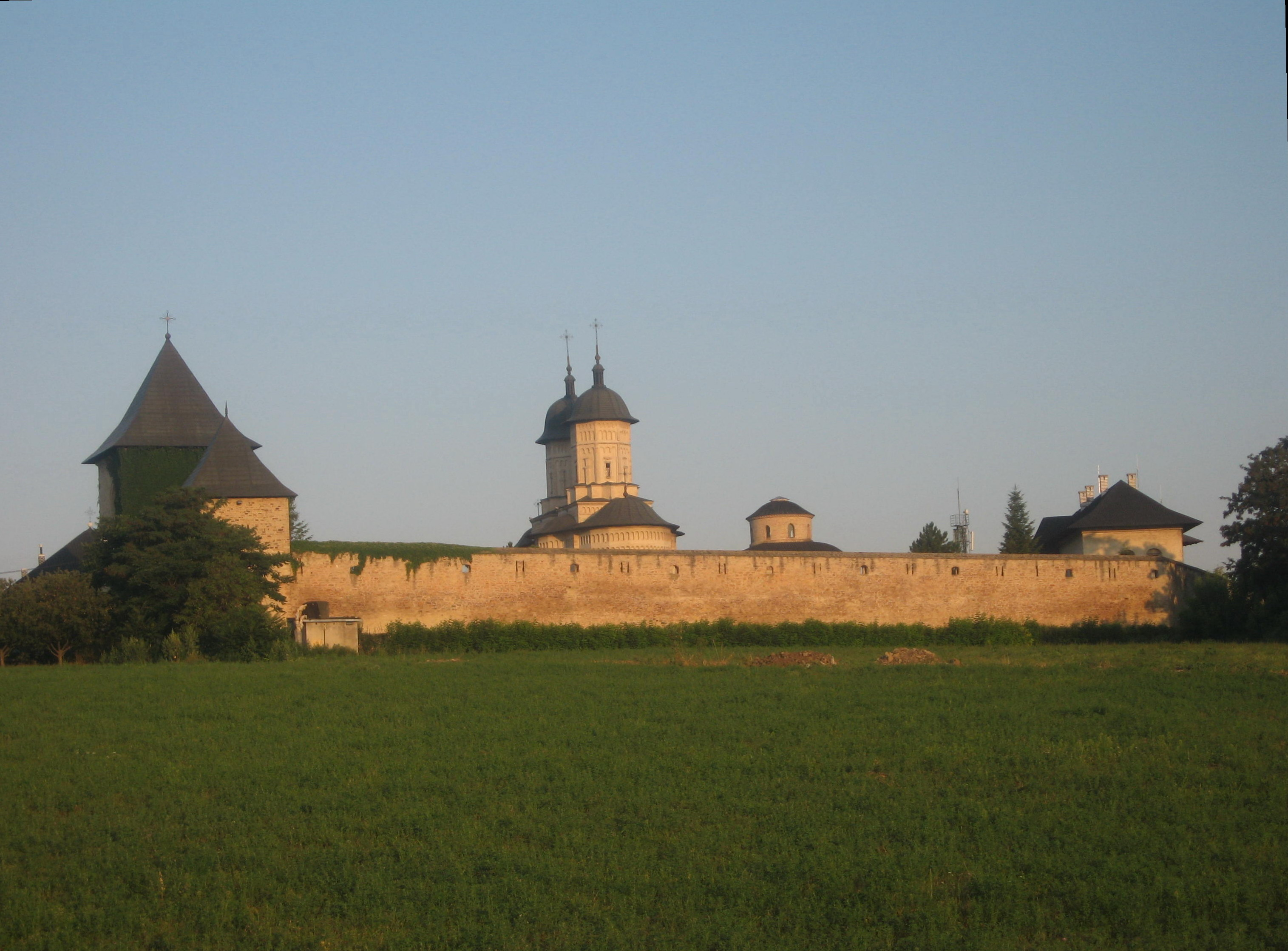

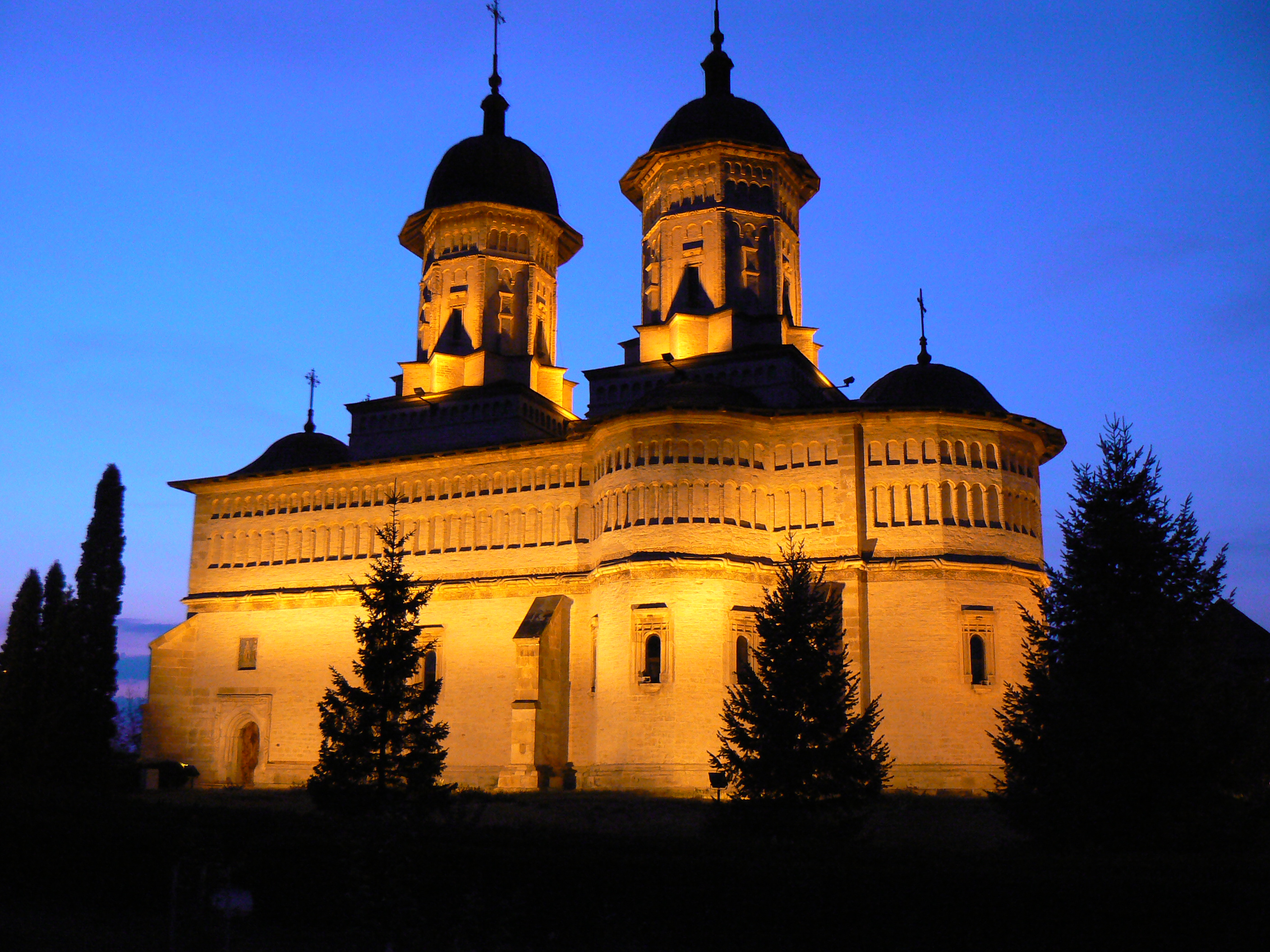
