= Cantemir =

Cantemir or Kantemir may refer to:

== People ==
- Moldavia's Cantemirești dynasty:
  - Antioh Cantemir (1670-1726), son of Constantin Cantemir, Voivode of Moldavia
  - Antiokh Dmitrievich Kantemir (1708-1744), son of Dimitrie Cantemir, man of letters and Russian diplomat
  - Constantin Cantemir (1614–1693), Voivode of Moldavia
  - Dimitrie Cantemir (1673–1723), son of Constantin Cantemir, Voivode of Moldavia and a prolific man of letters
  - Maria Dmitrievna Cantemirovna (1700–1754), daughter of Dimitrie Cantemir - Romanian noble, lady-in-waiting, salonist and a mistress of Tsar Peter the Great
- Kantemir Balagov (born 1991), Russian filmmaker
- Kantemir Berkhamov (born 1988), Russian footballer

== Places ==
- Cantemir, Moldova, a city in the Republic of Moldova
- Cantemir, Oradea, a quarter/district of the city of Oradea, Romania
- Budu Cantemir
- Cantemir District, a district in the south of Moldova
- Cantemir metropolitan area
- Cantemir Palace in Istanbul

== Other ==
- Kantemir (film), a horror movie starring Robert Englund
