= Peter the Great: The Testament =

- Russian DVD cover
- Genre: Historical drama
- Created by: Vladimir Bortko
- Starring: Alexander Baluyev; Elizabeth Boyar; Irina Rozanova; Sergei Makovetsky; Valery Solovyev; Mikhail Boyarsky; Anna Kovalchuk
- Theme music composer: Vladimir Dashkevich
- Country of origin: Russia
- Original language: Russian
- No. of seasons: 1
- No. of episodes: 4

Production
- Producers: Anton Zlatopolsky; Vladimir Bortko
- Running time: 54 minutes
- Production companies: Reveille Eire; Showtime Networks

Original release
- Network: Rossiya 1
- Release: 11 May 2011

Peter the Great: The Testament is a Russian TV series about Peter the Great, made in 2011 and based on the novel by Daniil Granin's Evenings with Peter the Great. The film was produced by Studio 2-B-2 entertainment and was shown on Rossiya 1, the Russian TV channel and NBC, the American TV channel.

== Plot ==
The film tells the story of the last years of the great monarch, Peter. He appears sick, lonely, and very concerned about those who leave their country. He wants to marry a princess before he will die, so that the throne will be secured for the future monarch. His companions, loyal before, are now only concerned about their own future and their future fate, after the death of the emperor. Who will get Russia and what will happen to the country after the death of the beloved Emperor?

== Cast ==
- Alexander Baluyev — Peter
- Elizaveta Boyarskaya — Maria Cantemir
- Irina Rozanova — Catherine I
- Sergei Makovetsky — Alexander Menshikov
- Alexander Filippenko — Pyotr Tolstoy
- Sergei Shakurov — Fyodor Romodanovsky
- Valery Solovyev — Pavel Yaguzhinsky
- Mikhail Boyarsky — Prince Dmitry Kantemir
- Anna Kovalchuk — Anastasia Trubetskaya-Cantemir
- Cyril Astafiev — Antioh Cantemir
- Valery Grishko — Fyodor Apraksin
- Willem Mons — A favourite of the Empress
- Lyudmila Shevel — Bulk
- Jeremy Noble — Dr Paulson
- Klaus-Dieter Bang — Blumentrost
- Alexander Bashirov — Court jester to Peter I Ivan Balakirev
- Igor Golovin — Makarov
- Vladimir Matveev — Alexey Kurbatov
- Mukhtar Gusengadzhiyev — Dowd
- Vladimir Borchaninov — Count Sheremetev
- Alexander Malyavin — Executioner
- Yuri Loparev — Efim Nikonov
- Galina Zhdanova — Tatiana Yushkova
- Konstantin Vorobyov — Doctor Palikula
- Ivan Krasko — Old Man
- Yefim Kamenetsky — Andrei Nartov
- Alex Zubarev — French engineer

== Crew ==
- Writers: Igor Afanasyev, Vladimir Bortko
- Director: Vladimir Bortko
- Producers: Anton Zlatopolsky, Vladimir Bortko
- Operator: Elena Ivanova
- Artists: Vladimir Svetozarov, Marina Nikolaeva
- Composer: Vladimir Dashkevich
- Dress: Larissa Konnikova
- Make-up: Lily Rusetskaya
- Installation: Leda Semyonova
- Sound: Sergei Moshkov
- First Assistant Director: Tatiana Rozantseva
- Director: Vladimir Bortko

== Premiere ==
The premiere took place on the channel "Rossiya 1" on May 14, 2011 (two series), and May 15 (two series) and NBC on May 21, 2011.

== Historical discrepancies ==
- The famous treatise by Vatsyayana Mallanaga, Kama Sutra was translated into European languages only in the late-19th century.
- Dowd, played by Mukhtar Gusengadzhiyev, calls himself a Lezghin. The Lezgins became known in Russia only after Peter the Great's Caspian campaign of 1722-1723.
- In a conversation with the Empress Catherine I, Maria Cantemir categorically calls herself a descendant of the Byzantine imperial Palaeologus family. The Cantemirești family, who ruled in Moldavia, had Tatar roots going back to Murza Khan Temir (Murza the Iron Emperor), who settled in the Moldavian principality in 1540 and adopted the Orthodox faith. On the other hand, Maria Cantemir's mother Casandra Cantacuzino, belonged to the Cantacuzino family, which claimed descent from the Byzantine Emperor John VI Kantakouzenos.
- In an interview with Peter the Great, Maria Cantemir refers to the "Bulletin of the French Geographical Society» (Société de Géographie, founded in 1821).
- Count Pyotr Tolstoy, sitting in a boat on the Neva, calls a two-masted square-rigged ship a "frigate". In fact it is either a brig or a packet.
- The film, which takes place in 1722-1725, features Ivan Fyodorovich Romodanovsky (died 1730, played by Sergei Shakurov), the son of Fyodor Romodanovsky (who died in 1717).
- The funeral procession of Emperor Peter (died 1725), with pall-bearers in 18th-century attire, passes through 21st-century Saint Petersburg.

== Prizes and awards ==
- The highest award of the city - Badge of Honor "For services to St. Petersburg" (BaltInfo 05/27/2011)
- "The Order of Merit of Moldova", Mikhail Boyarsky and Elizabeth Boyar, "a sign of the high recognition of special achievements in the development of Moldovan-Russian cooperation in the field of culture and talent for the realization of artistic images of the Moldavian Ruler Dmitry Kantemir and Princess Mary Cantemir in the film" Peter the Great. Will. " (CP SP 29/10/2011) (28/10/2011 Argumenty.ru) ("Arguments and Facts in St. Petersburg" 10/28/2011)
