= Vie, Oradea =

District of Oradea, Bihor County, Romania

Vie (IPA: /'vi.e/), is a district (or quarter), of Oradea, a city in Bihor, Romania. The name means vineyard in Romanian.

== Geography ==
Vie is situated in the hills overlooking Oradea, in the northern part of the town. It spans quite a large area, from a part just north of the hills but the centre extending quite far into the Oradea hills. Vie is bounded in the south by Republicii Street (Strada Republicii), the mainline railway tracks crossing Oradea and the Oradea central railway station (everything south of the railway station is considered part of the city centre, or Centru, everything north is considered part of Vie.

== Infrastructure and demographics ==
The range of infrastructure in Vie is quite broad – the southern part of the quarter, which is in proximity to the city centre, can be described as suburban, containing either low-rise houses or apartment blocks with up to five storeys. However, as one proceeds north, away from the Oradea city centre, the quarter becomes increasingly rural, with larger houses and larger gardens. Many of the roads in the northern part of Vie are unpaved. The northern part of the quarter contains several vineyards and wine-growing estates.

Additionally, as central Oradea became more expensive and densely populated in the 1990s, Vie became an attractive residential area for the city's higher-income population sectors. Nowadays, a large proportion of Vie's residents, especially in the northern areas, are high-income earners who have built mansions and large estates due to the fairly low-density profile of the area. This has led to the area being described as a quarter for the elite, even though land prices remain lower than those in the city centre. Vie has been (and remains) attractive for high-income earners because it combines relative proximity to Oradea city centre with the opportunity for a more laid-back, relaxed lifestyle. Many businessmen and politicians may also have a residence (usually a small apartment) in the city centre, while maintaining a larger house in Vie. Many people have also bought investment properties in the area as land prices have soared and continue to rise at a fast rate (in the broader context of Romania's economic boom).

== Health ==
Apart from high-income housing, and low- and medium-density housing, Vie also contains the Bihor County Hospital (Spitalul Judeţean), Oradea's major hospital, which was built in the 1970s to replace the older hospital in the city centre, which was becoming too small and cramped for the city's needs. Vie is also home to two other major hospitals: the Pulmonary Diseases Hospital (more commonly known as The Tuberculosis Hospital, or Spital TBC) and the Oradea Mental Hospital. The reason why a wide variety of health infrastructure is available in Vie is due to the relatively low-density of the area as well as a lower amount of pollution than in the city centre or adjacent suburbs.

== Transport ==
One area where Vie is lacking is in terms of transport infrastructure. The general lack of transport links to the Oradea city centre have been caused by three main factors, namely:

- the relatively steep terrain of the area
- its low population density and lack of commercial or industrial land uses
- more recently, the presence of high-income earners in the area, a sector of the population which has greater rates of car ownership, therefore creating less demand for public transport services than in other districts of Oradea

These factors, combined with Vie's proximity to the city in some parts, have led to the area being served by virtually no public transport, besides the easy access to Oradea's main railway station, which is at the southern boundary of Vie, and a bus route (line 13) which links the three hospitals of Vie with the city centre of Oradea (and passes through the quarter's main roads). In fact, Vie is the only district in Oradea not to be served by a tram line. Some roads in the quarter, especially those in steeper terrain or in the northern parts, are unpaved, making access more difficult.

Districts of Oradea
Oradea | Vie | Nufărul | Rogerius | Velența | Cantemir | Ioșia
See also: Bihor | Romania
