= Cantemir, Oradea =

District of Oradea, Bihor County, Romania

Cantemir is a district of the Romanian city of Oradea.

== History ==
At the end of the 1950s, several apartment complexes with neighborhood amenities were under construction in the city, such as the one near 23 August (1 Decembrie) Park, at the entrance to Calea 1 Mai (Mareşal Averescu) or on Decebal Street. In general, they were built on land without buildings or with few buildings.

This was also the case on Cantemir Street, in the area delimited by the Peţa stream and Bistriţei Street, and opposite, on Făgăraşului. The blocks were built in stages, the first three, with three floors each and access via exterior corridors, being handed over in 1960. The project provided for 440 apartments in the same block. By 1967, most of the buildings were ready or under construction, with the blocks from Feldioarei, block C4 on Cantemir Street, C9 and C10 from Erkel Ferenc Street and C8 on Bistriţei still under construction that year.

All were completed in 1968. In 1971, a commercial complex was opened in the middle of the block, which included a grocery store, bookstore, confectionery, metal and chemical store and post office. On the other side of the micro-block, towards Triumfului Street (Sextil Puşcariu), a school was built. The new complex was connected to the city by a tram line, which ended in front of the Brewery.

The oldest of the blocks were renovated and atticed in the 2000s, while the commercial complex lost its importance. Most of its spaces are vacant, the only constant occupant being the Post Office no. 10.

Across the road, in 1985, the statue of Dimitrie Cantemir, a work belonging to Ion Irimescu, was placed. In the years 1990-2000, the area did not benefit from any public investments, but several dozen garages appeared between the blocks. They were dismantled between 2019-2020, and pedestrian alleys and parking spaces were later arranged.

Two years later, in the context of the modernization of Cantemir Boulevard, similar investments were made in the other half of the area, towards Theodor Aman and Ştefan Luchian arteries, ultimately creating 224 new parking spaces, alleys and access to the block stairs.

In the same yard, a telephone exchange was built about three decades ago. Closed and unused for several years, it is now being renovated, and will include offices for rent. The "Dimitrie Cantemir" elementary school is still awaiting a general renovation.

Districts of Oradea
Oradea | Vie | Nufărul | Rogerius | Velența | Cantemir | Ioșia
See also: Bihor | Romania
