= John Komnenos Molyvdos =

Ottoman Greek scholar and physician (1657–1719)

John Komnenos Molyvdos (Greek: Ιωάννης Κομνηνός Μόλυβδος), also known by his monastic name Hierotheos (Ἱερόθεος) (1657–1719), was an Ottoman Greek scholar and physician, who later in life became a monk and Eastern Orthodox metropolitan bishop of Side and Dristra. He was a descendant of the Byzantine imperial dynasty of the Komnenoi, specifically of the branch that ruled the Empire of Trebizond, and is often regarded as the last member of the imperial family, excluding his illegitimate son John, later Komnenosoğlu Molyvdoszade Yahya Bey.

== Origin ==
Based on the date of his baptism (26 January 1658), John was born in mid-December 1657 at Heraclea Perinthus. The Romanian scholars Nicolae Iorga and N. Vatamanu considered John to hail from Lesbos, but it is securely attested that John was born in Heraclea; in a work whose edition he supervised, he calls himself "Perinthian" after the city's ancient name.

According to a document he commissioned from the Metropolitan of Heraclea, Neophytus III, in September 1695, John was the son of Alexios Komnenos, surnamed "Molyvdos", who had been consecrated as a priest in 1656. Alexios in turn was the son of Theodore Komnenos, who died in 1637; the document traces the ancestry through four more generations to another Theodore Komnenos, who in 1480 settled with his family at Heraclea. According to the document, this Theodore was the great-grandson of the Emperor of Trebizond Basil Megas Komnenos (r. 1332–1340).

== Early life and career as a physician and scholar ==
=== Education ===
After completing his elementary education in his home town, John left to attend the Patriarchal Academy in the nearby capital of the Ottoman Empire, Constantinople. He probably attended the school in 1676–80—the exact dates are unknown—and studied theology, philosophy, grammar, and medicine. His enrollment in the school was a decisive moment in his career, as he made many acquaintances from among the circle of Ottoman Greek scholars of Constantinople, with whom he would maintain close relations in later years; among them were his teachers Sevastos Kyminitis and Antonios Spandonis, the Metropolitan of Adrianople Neophytus Filaretos, the Archbishop of Nyssa Germanus, the future Patriarch of Jerusalem Chrysanthos Notaras, and Ioannis Karyofyllis.

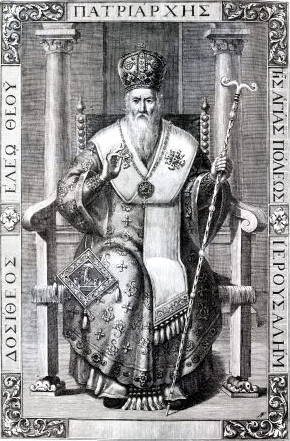
Patriarch Dositheos II of Jerusalem

Following his graduation, John was appointed a notary to the Patriarchate of Constantinople, but soon left the city for Iași, capital of Moldavia, where in October 1683 he published his first work, a collected edition of the works of Symeon of Thessalonica, together with Markos Eugenikos' treatise Exposition of the Church's Daily Prayer. It was dedicated to the Prince of Moldavia, George Ducas, who along with Patriarch Dositheos II of Jerusalem had sponsored the establishment of a Greek printing press in the Cetățuia Monastery in the previous year. John had probably been recruited to staff the new enterprise. At the same time, he served as tutor to George Ducas' son Constantine, alongside the Phanariote scholars Azarias Kigalas and Skarlatos Spandonis. Moldavia entered a period of instability after 1683 with the fall of Ducas and a Tartar raid; the printing press seems to have suspended its operation until 1694, with the exception of a brief period in 1685 after the appointment of Constantin Cantemir to the voivodeship. John's activity during this period is unclear, but from a couple of letters to Neophytus of Adrianople it emerges that at least during the first year of Cantemir's rule he was at Iași, working as tutor to the new voivode's son Dimitrie Cantemir.

Nevertheless, by the autumn of 1686 John had left Moldavia and gone to Padua, to study medicine at the University of Padua, which at the time was a popular destination for Greeks wishing to pursue higher education. Although already in 1686 Germanus of Nyssa offered him the position of court doctor in the Wallachian capital, Bucharest, in succession to the retiring Iakovos Pylarinos, John continued his studies at Padua despite his great financial difficulties, which were partly overcome with the financial support of the Karyofyllis family. During his studies at Padua he became a friend of the local English embassy official, as a result of which he participated in an official trip to England in early 1687. In December 1687 he succeeded in entering the Greek Palaiokapas college, and became a member of the Greek Community of Venice. Finally, on 23 January 1691, John received his diploma as a "doctor-philosopher" and left Italy.

=== Service in Russia and wanderings ===
From Italy, John moved to Russia, responding to an invitation to work at the Tsar's court, probably through the intercession of Pylarinos, who had been chief physician there in 1690, or the Greek-born Russian envoy to Venice, Ioannikios Leichoudes. From Venice John crossed the Polish Commonwealth and arrived at Kiev on 8 July 1691. His career at the Russian court is obscure, but Russian sources report that he succeeded Pylarinos as head physician when the latter left the country in 1692. During his stay in Moscow, in 1693, he translated from Latin to the vernacular Greek the medieval ecclesiastical treatise Quattor novissimom liber, and this was probably also the period when he composed four epigraphs on behalf of Tsar Peter the Great (r. 1682–1725) and his brother Ivan V (r. 1682–1696) for donations they made to Christian sites in the Holy Land. Despite his successful career at the Russian court, for unknown reasons John was not satisfied; a letter to Kyminitis (then headmaster of the Princely Academy of Bucharest) and his subsequent career show that he had sought the (unspecified) assistance of the Prince of Wallachia Constantin Brâncoveanu (r. 1688–1714). He evidently obtained that in 1694, for in that year he was discharged from Russian service with a referral in Latin, signed by Tsar Peter himself, and by 29 September he was in Bucharest. He dedicated his next two translations into modern Greek, Diogenes Laërtius' Lives and Opinions of Eminent Philosophers and the Sayings of Kings and Commanders from Plutarch's Moralia, to Brâncoveanu. John was evidently aiming for an appointment as court physician at Brâncoveanu's court, but this did not happen. A possible explanation may lie in the falling out between Brâncoveanu with John's patron, Dositheos II of Jerusalem, in the period 1692–1697.

In letters of the period he inquires of his friends about the situation in Constantinople, and mentions an invitation by his former pupil, Constantine Ducas, then in his first (1693–1695) tenure as Prince of Moldavia, but John's actual whereabouts and activities until 1697 are largely unknown. If he went to Iași, he probably did not stay there long after Ducas' expulsion in December 1695 by Antioh Cantemir. During this time, he may have composed an epitaph for Theodoros Trapezountios, a professor at the Princely Academy, who died on 7 September 1695. At the same time he sought and obtained the certificate of his descent from the Komnenian emperors, and may then have gone to Constantinople, before going on pilgrimage to the Holy Land.

He was again at Constantinople sometime before February 1697, when Patriarch Adrian of Moscow sent letters to Chrysanthos Notaras inquiring about John and proposing him as the successor of the Leichoudes brothers at the helm of the Slavic Greek Latin Academy in Moscow. Adrian also proposed to ask John to supervise the establishment of a Greek printing press there, a project sponsored both by Adrian and Dositheos II of Jerusalem. John was interested, but evidently troubled about the conditions prevailing in Russia, for in a letter by Dositheos to Adrian, dated 6 March 1698, Dositheos reported that John was willing to accept, but only under specific conditions: that he would be allowed to exercise his medical skills alongside his scholarly duties; that he would be provided with sufficient remuneration during his stay; and that, as soon as the main task, the establishment of the Greek press, was completed, he would be allowed to leave for the Danubian Principalities. Dositheos, who may have shared in John's reservations, recommended acceptance of his terms, with a proposed contract for five years. Nothing came of this, however, especially in the tumultuous political and religious climate in Russia following Adrian's death in 1700 and the reforms of Peter the Great.

=== Service in Wallachia ===
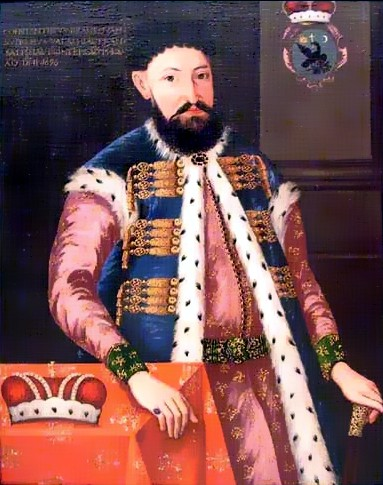
Constantin Brâncoveanu, Prince of Wallachia and John's patron

In the meantime, however, John had entered the far more familiar, and lucrative, service of the Wallachian court. Already in summer 1697 his name appears in the fiscal records as a court physician, alongside Pylarinos and another Greek, Pantaleon Kalliarchis. John was further assigned the duty of accompanying Wallachian troops in the field—as an Ottoman vassal, Wallachia was involved in the Great Turkish War—and equipped with a cart for carrying wounded soldiers. He remained in the Wallachian court until 1702, with an annual salary of 800 thalers initially, rising to 1,000 after autumn 1700.

This period was one of the most productive in John's career: enjoying a good salary and the favour of both Brâncoveanu and his influential uncle, stolnic Constantin Cantacuzino, he was able to engage in his literary and translation activity with new vigour. In 1698, John made a pilgrimage to Mount Athos, which became the source for what is perhaps his most famous work, the Pilgrim's Guidebook to the Holy Mount Athos (Προσκυνητάριον τοῦ Ἁγίου Ὄρους τοῦ Ἂθωνος), published at his own expense at the printing press of the Snagov Monastery in 1701. He also participated in four other works published at Snagov, by providing epigraphs honouring the authors and/or Brâncoveanu, who funded them: a single-volume edition, published in February 1699, of Peter Mogila's Confession of Faith and Bessarion Makris' On the Three Greatest Virtues; a Greek–Arabic edition of the Three Divine Liturgies (St. James, St. Basil, St. John Chrysostom), published in January 1701; an Almanac by Kyminitis, published in June 1701; and a Greek–Arabic Horologion, published in 1702. For the latter, John's previous epigraph from the Three Divine Liturgies was simply reprinted, and it was reprinted again for the 1703 Commentary and Liturgy on the Dedication of a Church, published at Bucharest by Anthimos the Iberite with funding by Brâncoveanu.

Apart from contributing epigraphs, John also wrote a number of original works, in line with the humanist and scholarly endeavours pursued at the Wallachian court under the patronage of Brâncoveanu and Cantacuzino. In 1699, he wrote a biography of the Byzantine emperor John VI Kantakouzenos (r. 1347–1354), dedicated to Constantin Cantacuzino, whose family claimed descent from the emperor. The account is heavily fictionalized and idealized, meant to represent an ideal Christian, scholarly, and politically sage ruler rather than the historical figure, and flatter Cantacuzino as the ostensible heir and successor to his illustrious forebear. In December 1699, he composed the Prognostic Book on the Eclipse of the Sun that occurred in the Year 1699, September 13. This led some modern scholars to suggest that he was active in teaching mathematics and physics at the Princely Academy, but despite his evident interest in these subjects, this is nowhere corroborated. He also encouraged Cantacuzino and collaborated with him on the latter's map of Wallachia (1700), a work of remarkable accuracy on the political, historical, and economical geography of the country. In 1702, at Brâncoveanu's suggestion, John translated into modern Greek Theophylact of Ohrid's commentary on the Four Gospels, but this work was never published due to the contrary advice of Patriarch Callinicus II of Constantinople, according to whom it was useless for the educated, and too complicated for the ordinary people. In 1702, John lost his erstwhile teacher and close friend, Kyminitis, who died and was buried at Bucharest on 6 September. John composed a funerary epigraph for him, which was inscribed on his tombstone. John also had a major contribution in Kyminitis' final work, Doctrinal Instruction, published posthumously in 1703, through his translations from Latin.

== Ecclesiastical career ==
The Wallachian court records show that in autumn 1702, John resigned as court physician, to be replaced by the Italian Bartolomeo Ferrati. Despite his successful scholarly career, and for reasons that are unknown, John decided to enter the clergy. The details or time of his tonsure are unknown, but in September 1703 he is already recorded as a monk, in which capacity he participated in the boyar assembly convened at Arnavutköy to elect the successor of Constantine Ducas. In the assembly, he staunchly supported Brâncoveanu's candidate, Mihai Racoviță; Brâncoveanu's rival, Dimitrie Cantemir, credits John's speech with influencing many of the boyars towards Racoviță, who was finally elected as ruler of Moldavia.

=== Titular bishop of Side and abbot of the Kamariotissa monastery ===
Following his departure from the Wallachian court, John probably headed for Constantinople, where he was tonsured as a monk, assuming the monastic name "Hierotheos" (Ἱερόθεος). He enjoyed a rapid ascent, being promoted to presbyter and then titular bishop of Side by 1704. From this it appears that John, as an eminent scholar and someone interested in theological matters, had maintained contacts with patriarchal circles, and had perhaps received some offer from the Patriarchate that induced him to abandon his career at the Wallachian court. John was probably tonsured at the monastery of Theotokos Kamariotissa on the island of Chalke (modern Heybeliada), whose abbot he became following the death of the previous incumbent, Athanasios Malatestas, in January 1704. His residence at the monastery was at least in part for reasons of survival: as a titular bishop, he had no real source of income. He remained abbot at Kamariotissa until 1706, and was engaged in the renovation of the monastery and particularly the enrichment of its library. This period of his life is poorly documented; certainly his new duties at the monastery, but also at the patriarchal administration, forced him to suspend his literary and translation activity. In July 1705, at John's instigation, Brâncoveanu funded the construction of a well in Constantinople. In March 1706, he participated at a synod in the Patriarchate that confirmed the election of a new metropolitan bishop for Trebizond, but he was already preparing his resignation as abbot of Kamariotissa: on 13 September of the same year, he ordered a formal inventory of all items in the monastery's sacristy, and delivered it to his eventual successor, the sacristan Neophytos. It is known that he left again for Wallachia, but the reason, or the duration of his stay there, are unknown; indeed he is next mentioned only in a synod at the Patriarchate in December 1709.

=== Metropolitan of Dristra ===
After December 1709, the sources are silent on John's activities until a letter sent to him by Nicholas Mavrocordatos on 27 October 1711. In this letter, he is mentioned in a new position, as metropolitan bishop of Dristra. The last reference to his predecessor Athanasios is from August 1710, meaning that John was promoted to the see of Dristra sometime after that. The vicinity of Dristra to Wallachia, and John's own relations with Wallachia, was certainly a factor in his appointment there.

His career as Metropolitan of Dristra is well documented, both from Church documents as well as due to the survival of a large part of John's correspondence. The main challenge he faced during his tenure was financial: due to the poverty of the local Christian population, his own reluctance to enforce payment, and the need to cover the extortionate bribes of various Ottoman officials, John often not only found himself unable to pay the required sums to the Patriarchate and the Porte, but often he lacked money even for his private necessities. His correspondence during these years largely concerns pleas for assistance or intercession by his numerous acquaintances and patrons in high office. John was also an active participant in the patriarchal synod in Constantinople. He played a particularly important role in the Orthodox dialogue with the English non-jurors. On the other hand, his editorial activity declined, mostly due to the political turmoil engulfing the Danubian Principalities at the time. Only during the tenures of his friend Nicholas Mavrocordatos, who provided him with financial assistance, was he able to resume some of his previous publishing activity.

In 1719, following the restoration of Mavrocordatos to the throne of Wallachia, John returned to Bucharest, where he translated the 15th-century treatise The Imitation of Christ into Greek. An encomiastic introduction to Mavrocordatos' Liber de Officiis, which was published in December 1719, is the last known work by John, who died sometime during that year. He was probably buried in Bucharest, but the exact site remains a mystery.

== Sources ==
- Nicol, Donald M. (1971). "The Doctor-Philosopher John Comnen of Bucharest and His Biography of the Emperor John Kantakouzenos". Revue des études sud-est européennes. 9: 511–526.
- Pantos, Dimitrios (2007). Ιωάννης-Ιερόθεος Κομνηνός μητροπολίτης Δρύστρας (1657-1719): βίος - εκκλησιαστική δράση - συγγραφικό έργο (PhD thesis) (in Greek). National and Kapodistrian University of Athens. doi:10.12681/eadd/22408. hdl:10442/hedi/22408.
