= Antioch Cantemir =

Antioch Cantemir may refer to either of:

- Antioh Cantemir (1670–1726), Prince of Moldavia
- Antiochus Kantemir (1708–1744), his nephew
