= Myurego =

Myurego Мюрего Мурега
- Selo
- Location within Republic of Dagestan Location within Russia
- Coordinates: 42°24′N 47°41′E
- Country: Russia
- Region: Republic of Dagestan
- District: Sergokalinsky District
- Time zone: UTC+3:00

Myurego (Russian: Мюрего; Dargwa: Мурега) is a rural locality (a selo) in Sergokalinsky District, Republic of Dagestan, Russia. Population: 3,877 (2021 census); 4,248 (2002 census); 2,317 (1989 Soviet census). There are 17 streets.

== Geography ==
Myurego is located 10 km southeast of Sergokala (the district's administrative centre) by road, on the Kakaozen river. Utamysh and Sergokala are the nearest rural localities.

== Nationalities ==
Dargins live there.

== Famous residents ==
- Mukhtar Gusengadzhiyev (actor of circus, film and television, Master of Yoga)
