= Dmitry Mikhailovich Golitsyn the Younger =

Russian diplomat (1721–1793)

Dmitry Mikhailovich Golitsyn
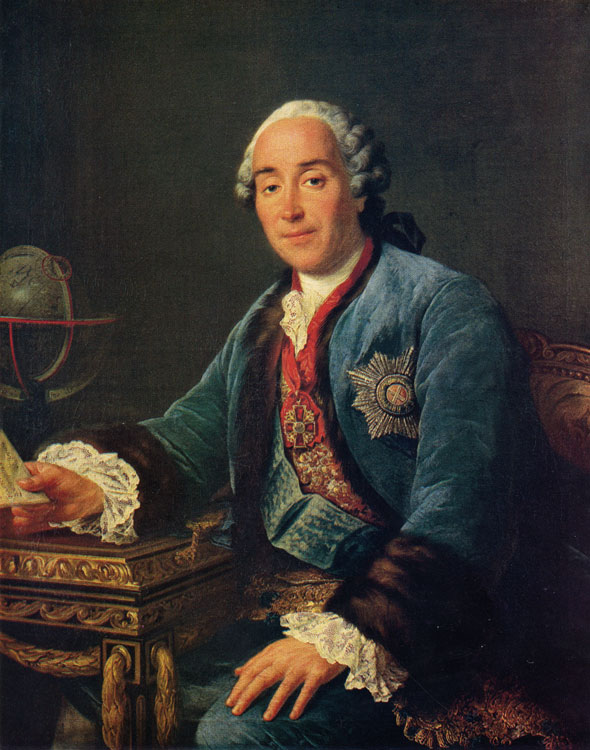
- Portrait by François-Hubert Drouais, 1762
- Born: 15 May 1721; Åbo, Swedish Finland
- Died: 19 September 1793 (aged 72); Vienna, Holy Roman Empire
- Noble family: House of Golitsyn
- Spouse: Ekaterina Dmitrievna Cantemir
- Father: Prince Mikhail Mikhailovich Golitsyn
- Mother: Yevdokiya Buturlina
- Occupation: Russian ambassador to Austria

Prince Dmitry Mikhailovich Golitsyn or Gallitzin (Russian: Дмитрий Михайлович Голицын, IPA: [ˈdmʲitrʲɪj mʲɪˈxajləvʲɪdʑ ɡɐˈlʲitsɨn]; German: Demetrius Michalowitsch von Gallitzin; 15 May 1721 – 19 September 1793) was a Russian diplomat, philanthropist and art collector from the Golitsyn family. He served as the Russian ambassador to Austria from 1761 to 1792.

He was the son of Field Marshal Michael Golitsyn, and a grandson of Prince Boris Kurakin.

== Career ==
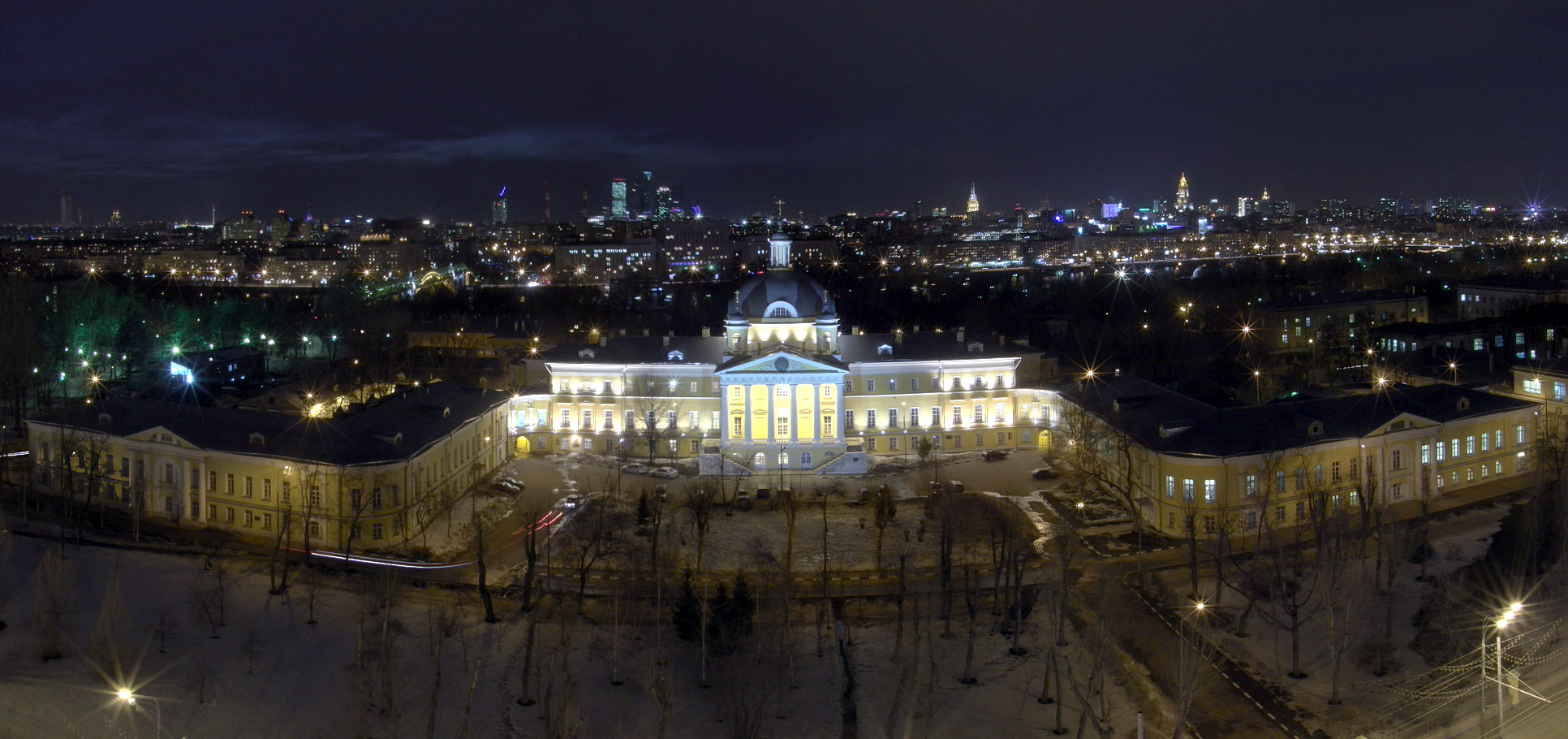
The Golitsyn Hospital on Leninsky Avenue, Moscow

In the late 1750s, Prince Golitsyn resided in Paris, where he headed the Russian embassy during the Seven Years' War. His wife Catherine died there in 1761. Her liaison with actress La Clairon gained great notoriety. Catherine was the daughter of Dimitrie Cantemir, the former ruler of Moldavia, by Princess Anastasiya Trubetskaya. She was also the sister of Antiochus Cantemir.

From 1761 to 1792 he was the ambassador of the Russian Empire to the Holy Roman Empire, with the poet Ludwig Heinrich von Nicolay as his secretary. Catherine the Great bestowed on him the Order of St. Andrew for negotiating the First Partition of Poland with Emperor Joseph II. The prince was acclaimed for having returned to Russia the lands annexed by his patrilineal ancestor, Grand Duke Gediminas.

In the winter of 1782, Wolfgang Amadeus Mozart was engaged for all the concerts given by Gallitzin who "placed his carriage at my disposal both going and returning, and treated me in the handsomest manner possible". Gallitzinberg is the hill near Vienna where the Russian ambassador built his residence (with an artificial Roman ruin and a round temple still standing). Gallitzinstraße in Vienna is also named after him.

The childless Prince Golitsyn, wishing to keep the memory of his wife alive for future generations, donated a large sum to establish the Golitsyn Hospital in Moscow. His palace in Vienna boasted several hundred paintings by Old Masters. After his death, these paintings were exhibited in the gallery of the Golitsyn Hospital before being auctioned off in order to finance the hospital's extension.
