= Ion Neculce =

Moldavan chronicler (1672–1745)

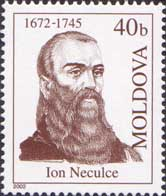
- Born: 1672
- Died: 1745 (aged 72–73)
- Known for: The Chronicles of the land of Moldavia (from the rule of Dabija Vodă to the second rule of Constantin Mavrocordat)

Ion Neculce (1672–1745) was a Moldovan chronicler. His main work, Letopisețul Țărâi Moldovei [de la Dabija Vodă până la a doua domnie a lui Constantin Mavrocordat] (The Chronicles of the land of Moldavia [from the rule of Dabija Vodă to the second rule of Constantin Mavrocordat) was meant to extend Miron Costin's narrative, covering events from 1661 to 1743.

== Life ==
Ion Neculce was born in 1672, into a family of Greek descent, related to the Cantacuzino. Under Antioh Cantemir he was made a Spatharios and second in rank in the army after the voivode, but achieved his highest rank under the rule of Dimitrie Cantemir when he was made grand hatman for supporting Peter I of Russia in the Russo-Turkish wars.

When the Russians lost the war, Ion Neculce, alongside Dimitrie Cantemir, went to Russia. He spent a few years there, until 1719 when he returned to Moldavia, where under the rule of Constantin Mavrocordat was appointed vornic. This was his last function before dying in 1745.

== Works ==
- Letopiseţul Ţărâi Moldovei (de la Dabija Vodă până la a doua domnie a lui Constantin Mavrocordat);
- O samă de cuvinte

== Gallery ==
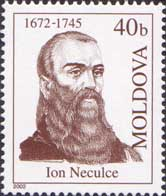

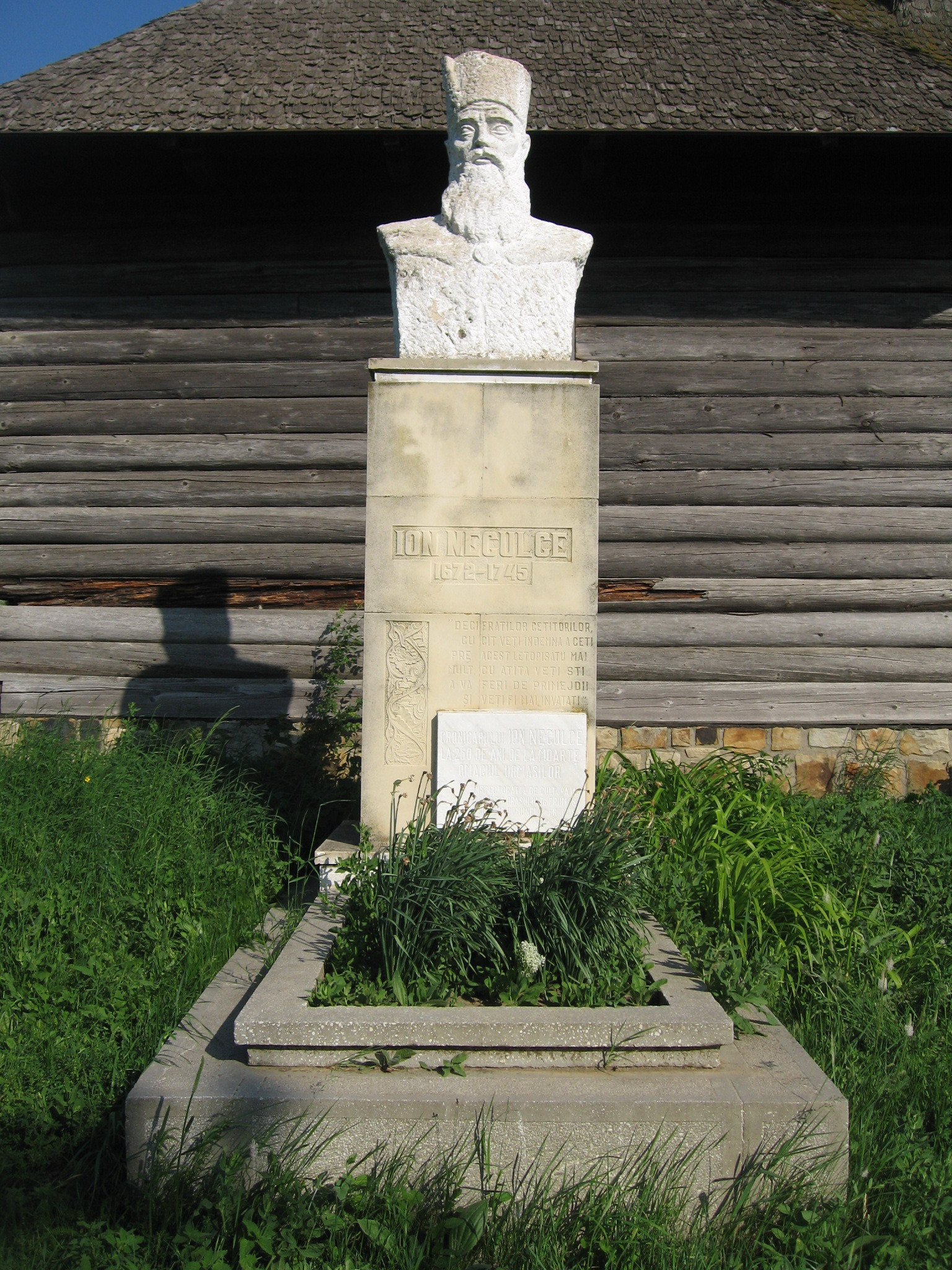
His tomb in Prigoreni village
