= Constantin Cantemir =

Moldavian nobleman (1612–1693)

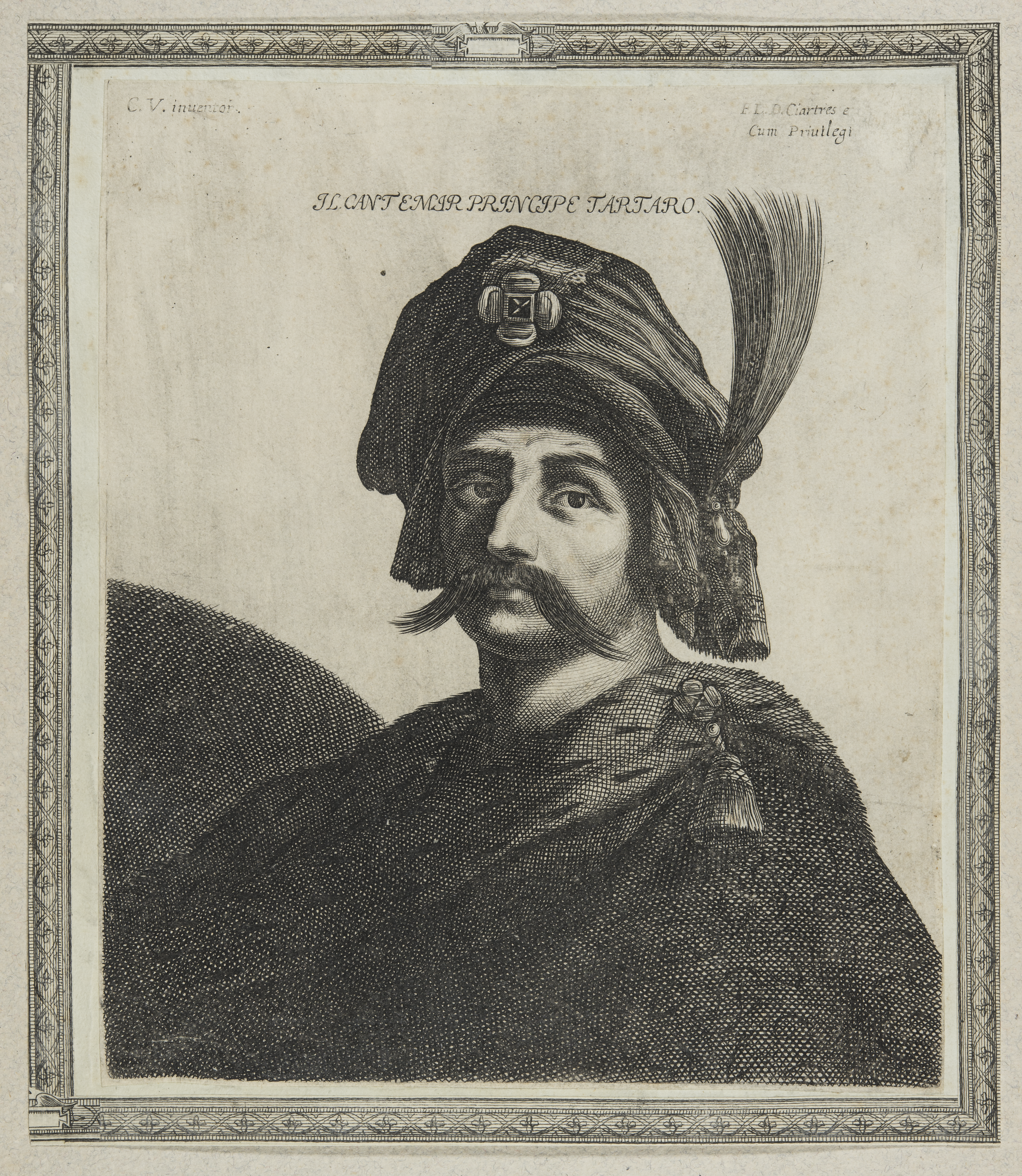
- Copper engraving by François L'Anglois

Prince of Moldavia
- Reign: 25 June 1685 – 27 March 1693
- Predecessor: Dumitraşcu Cantacuzino
- Successor: Dimitrie Cantemir
- Born: 8 November 1612
- Died: 13 March 1693 (aged 80)
- Issue: Antioh Cantemir, Dimitrie Cantemir
- Dynasty: Cantemirești
- Religion: Orthodox

Constantin or Constantine Cantemir (8 November 1612 – 13 March 1693) was a Moldavian nobleman, soldier, and statesman who served as voivode between 25 June 1685 and 27 March 1693. He established the Cantemir dynasty which—with interruptions—ruled Moldavia prior to the imposition of phanariot rule.

== Life ==
Constantin was born into a Moldavian family of Crimean Tatar origin in 1612. He was created voivode of Moldavia by its Ottoman overlords in 1685, being favored over his rival Dumitraşcu Cantacuzino. (His son Demetrius would later marry a Cantacuzene princess.) Constantin was a good and conscientious ruler, protecting his people from rapacious tax farmers. He largely brought peace to his realm, but served in campaigns of the Great Turkish War against Poland and Austria. Under his rule, Moldavia was invaded twice, once by the Nogai Tatars and once by Poland. Nonetheless, he constantly informed the Polish and Habsburgs of Turkish designs and his sons Antioch and Demetrius, who eventually succeeded him, would be instrumental in allying Moldavia to Russia in its first wars against the Turks.

In 1691, Cantemir ordered Miron Costin, a Moldavian chronicler and man of letters, to be put to death on charges of conspiracy.

According to Neculce, Constantin was illiterate to the point of only being able to write his own signature. Nonetheless, he ensured that his sons received a good education. His son Demetrius was a prolific writer and polyglot, proficient in eleven languages. His grandson Antioch would serve as Russia's ambassador to Britain and France at the height of the Enlightenment, penning satires after Juvenal, translating Horace, and befriending Voltaire and Montesquieu.

Constantin died in 1693 at the age of 80. His son Demetrius notionally succeeded him but was passed over by the Ottomans in favor of Constantin Duca, who was supported by his father-in-law, the Wallachian voivode Constantin Brâncoveanu.

== See also ==
- Khan Temir

== Notes ==
Preceded by Dumitraşcu Cantacuzino	Prince/Voivode of Moldavia; 1685–1693	Succeeded by Dimitrie Cantemir
