= Sinteza =

Sinteza (BVB: STZ), is the name of a large chemical factory in Rogerius quarter, Oradea, Transylvania, Romania. During Communist times, it was a large employer in the area, even though now its operations have been considerably reduced. It does remain, however, one of Oradea's best known industrial areas.
