= Kapucu =

A kapucu (Turkish pronunciation: [kapudʒu]; Romanian: Kapudju or Capugiu) was an official envoy of the Ottoman Sultan in medieval Wallachia and Moldavia. Their missions were mostly associated with the recalling of subject hospodars or voivodes, often followed by their imprisonment or execution. Constantine Ducas was deposed as voivode of Moldavia in 1695 for having executed a kapucu sent to inspect his realm.
