= Ekaterina Golitsyna =

Russian noblewoman (1720–1761)

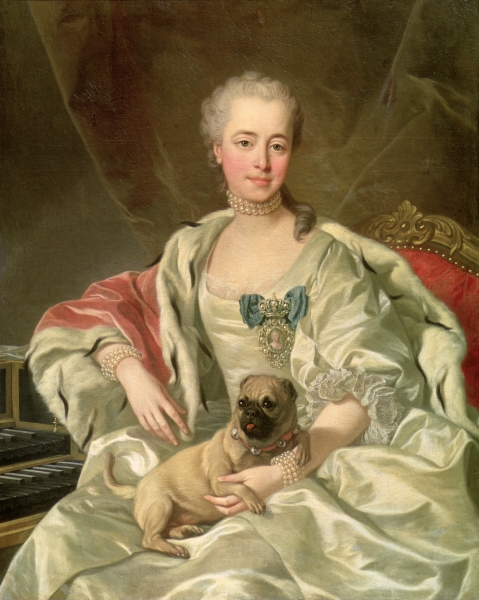
- Portrait by Charles-André van Loo, 1759
- Born: Ekaterina Dmitrievna Cantemir; 4 November 1720; Saint Petersburg, Russia
- Died: 2 November 1761 (aged 40); Paris, France
- Buried: Annunciation Church of the Alexander Nevsky Lavra
- Noble family: Cantemirești
- Spouse: Dmitry Mikhailovich Golitsyn the Younger
- Father: Dimitrie Cantemir
- Mother: Anastasiya Trubetskaya

Ekaterina Dmitrievna Golitsyna (Russian: Екатерина Дмитриевна Голицына; née Cantemir [Кантемир]; 4 November 1720 – 2 November 1761) was a Russian noblewoman of Moldavian ancestry.

== Biography ==
Born as Ekaterina Dmitrievna Cantemir in Saint Petersburg on 4 November 1720, she was the daughter of the Moldavian prince Dimitrie Cantemir (1673–1723). In 1711, her father accepted Russian citizenship and moved to Russia. He received, from Peter I, the title of Grand Duke and in 1717 married Princess Anastasiya Ivanovna Trubetskaya. They had three children, but only Ekaterina reached adulthood, later losing her father when she was only four years old.

In 1744, she became maid of honor, one of the most beautiful, charming and famous women in the entourage of Empress Elizabeth of Russia. In 1745, together with her mother, she went abroad to join her mother's second husband, Ludwig Gruno of Hesse-Homburg. After his death in Berlin, the mother and daughter did not immediately return home. They traveled extensively, lived in Paris for a few years, and, only with the death of their grandfather in 1750, returned to Russia.

== Marriage ==
Her childhood was very painful, and it is likely that she knew from a young age that she could not have children. For a long time she refused all offers of marriage, and only late in life she married Prince Dmitry Golitsyn, captain of the Izmailovsky Life Guards Regiment. The wedding took place on the 28 January 1751 at the imperial court, a lavish wedding and in the presence of Empress Elizabeth. On the day following the wedding a dinner and ball took place to which 200 people were invited.

In 1755, her mother died. In 1757 they left Russia with their uncle, Ivan Betskoy, arriving in Paris.

In 1760, Prince Dmitry Golitsyn was appointed Russian ambassador to Paris, and Ekaterina became one of the leading women at the royal palace in Versailles and Paris.

== Death ==
In 1761 Dmitry Golitsyn obtained a new diplomatic post in Vienna. However, he was unable to accept the post due to his wife's serious illness.

She died in Paris on 2 November 1761. The following year, the princess' remains were transferred to Saint Petersburg and buried in the Church of the Annunciation of the Aleksandr Nevsky Monastery.
