= Anastasiya Trubetskaya =

Russian noblewoman and courtier (1700–1755)

- Princess of Moldavia; Hereditary Princess of Hesse-Homburg
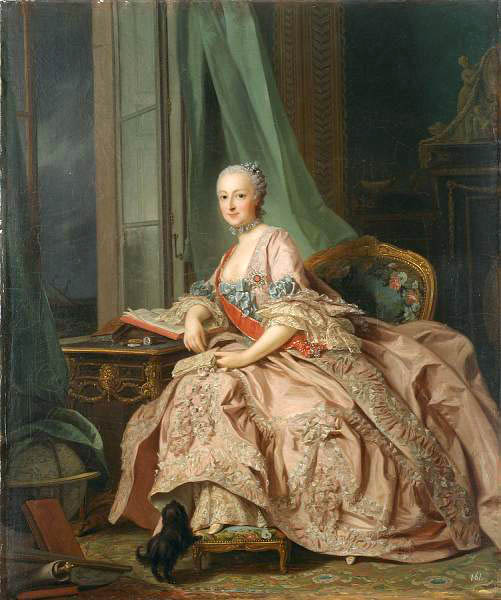
- Posthumous portrait by Alexander Roslin, National Gallery of Victoria, 1757
- Born: 4 October 1700
- Died: November 27, 1755 (aged 54–55); St. Petersburg, Russia
- Burial: Annunciation Church of the Alexander Nevsky Lavra
- Spouse: Dimitrie Cantemir; Ludwig Gruno, Hereditary Prince of Hesse-Homburg
- Issue: Ekaterina Golitsyna
- House: Trubetskoy (by birth); Cantemirești (by marriage); Hesse (by marriage)
- Father: Prince Ivan Trubetskoy
- Mother: Irina Grigoryevna Naryshkina

Anastasiya Ivanovna, Hereditary Princess of Hesse-Homburg and Princess Trubetskaya (also Princess Anastasia of Hesse-Homburg; Russian: Анастасия Трубецкая; 15 October [O.S. 4 October] 1700 – 8 December [O.S. 27 November] 1755) was a Russian noblewoman and courtier. She was a princess of Moldavia and a landgravine of Hesse-Homburg. She was a favourite of Empress Elizabeth of Russia, for whom she was a lady-in-waiting, and was seen as an honorary member of the Russian imperial family.

== Life ==
Born into the House of Trubetskoy on 4 October 1700 (O.S.), she was the daughter of Prince Ivan Trubetskoy (1667–1750) and his wife, Irina Grigoryevna Naryshkina (1671–1749). Her cousin was Prince Nikita Trubetskoy. She was married to Prince Dimitrie Cantemir in 1717, member of the powerful Moldavian House of Cantemir. By him she had a daughter Smaragda Catarina (1720–1761), reckoned one of the great beauties of her time, who married Prince Dmitriy Mikhailovich Golitsyn and was a friend of empress Elizabeth.

In 1738 she married for the second time to Hereditary Prince Ludwig Gruno of Hesse-Homburg, a German prince from the House of Hesse in Russian service.

Both during her first and second marriage, she belonged to the leading members of the Russian Imperial court and aristocratic life, and often hosted the monarchs as guests in her home. As both times being married to a foreign royal, she held the rank of foreign princess in the ceremonial court protocol, ranked first after the members of the Imperial family and played a visible and public role in court life.

She was also appointed Dame of the Order of Saint Catherine and lady in waiting to Empress Elizabeth. She left for Germany in 1745, and did not return until 1751, after which she became a noted philanthropist.

Anastasiya died in St. Petersburg on 27 November 1755 and was buried in the Alexander Nevsky Lavra, in the Church of the Annunciation.

== Sources ==
- "Анастасия Иоанновна" . Brockhaus and Efron Encyclopedic Dictionary (in Russian). 1906.
- Русские портреты XVIII и XIX столетий. / Издание вел. кн. Николая Михайловича. — 1907.
