= Cantemir Palace in Istanbul =

Coordinates: 41°2′49″N 29°1′37″E

- Interactive map of the Cantemir Palace in Istanbul area

General information
- Architectural style: Ottoman, Venetian, Balkan
- Location: Istanbul, Turkey
- Client: Dimitrie Cantemir

Technical details
- Structural system: main palace, pavilions and gardens

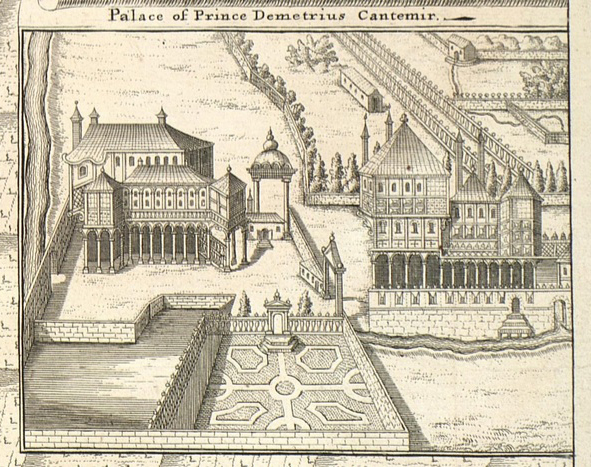
Palace of Moldavian Prince Dimitrie Cantemir in Istanbul, Ortaköy (caveat: not Bogdan Saray).

The Palace of Dimitrie Cantemir (Romanian: Palatul lui Dimitrie Cantemir; Turkish: Dimitri Kantemir Saray) was a palace owned by the Prince of Moldavia Dimitrie Cantemir in Istanbul, located on the grounds of the present-day Ortaköy Mosque.

== History ==
The structure, located along the pier that nowadays hosts the Ortaköy Mosque, was bought by Cantemir sometimes immediately after 1683 (the Battle of Vienna) from a brother of the Grand Vizier, and expanded in 1690-1691 and 1693–1694. A depiction of the palace made by Cantemir himself is found in Nicolas Tindal's translation of his work History of the Growth and Decay of the Ottoman Empire.

== See also ==
- Bogdan Saray
- Ottoman architecture

== Literature ==
- Liviu Brătuleani. Monumente uitate. Reşedinţa lui Dimitrie Cantemir din Istanbul .
