= Mukhtar Gusengadzhiyev =

Russian actor

- Мухтар Гусенгаджиев
- Born: 20 May 1964 (age 61); Izerbash, Dagestan ASSR, Russian SFSR, Soviet Union
- Occupation: Actor
- Years active: 1991–2014
- Known for: "Most flexible man in Europe"
- Notable work: Cirque du Soleil: Solstrom; Yeralash; Tsar; Peter the Great: The Testament; Devil's Pass

Mukhtar Magomedsharipovich Gusengadzhiyev (Russian: Мухтар Магомедшарипович Гусенгаджиев; born 20 May 1964) is a Russian actor of circus, film and television. Master of Yoga.

== Biography ==
Gusengadzhiyev was born as a Dargin. He studied at the Izmailovo Circus Studio (1989), the Darginsky Theater Studio (1990–1991), the Roman Theater Studio Raffaello Sanzio (1999–2000), the Cirque du Soleil acting studio (Montreal, 2003).

In 1996, he was declared the most flexible man in Europe at the International Yoga Congress in the Canary Islands. In 1998, Hollywood Broadcasting Company FOX-11 signed a contract to showcase him and record it in the Guinness Book of World Records as The World's Most Flexible Man.

He has performed on the stage of the ZUMANITY Theater of Cirque du Soleil in Las Vegas. He has also appeared in Black Belt and Kung Fu magazines.

On 2 April 2018 Mukhtar was sentenced to 22 years of strict regime with compulsory treatment for pedophilia, the creation and storage of child pornography.

== Filmography ==
- Paradise in the Shadow of Sabel (1992) as Prince Nutsal Khan
- Pistol with Muffler (1993) as crazy
- Cirque du Soleil: Solstrom (2003) as lonely prisoner
- Kulagin and Partners (2006) as Nikolay Abayev
- My Prechistenka (2007) as Jamshet
- Platon (2007) as Abdul
- Yeralash (2007) as Wushu fighters
- Tsar (2009) as episode
- Peter the Great: The Testament (2011) as Dowd
- Devil's Pass (2013) as Monster
- The Last of the Magikyans (2014) as Hamlet

== Awards and honors ==
- 1991 Laureate of the All-Russian Variety and Circus Festival Yalta'91
- 1993 Winner of the international festival of arts Gran Premio'93 in Milan, Italy
- 1995 Winner of the European Yoga Congress San Marino'95
- 1998 Laureate of the international teleorum Sochi-Lazurnaya'98
- 1998 Recorded in the Guinness World Record Book Los Angeles'98
- 2002 The record holder of the Guinness Book of Russia Divo'2002
- 2003 The record holder of the Book of Records of the CIS and Baltic Countries'2003
- 2004 The record holder of the Association of Russian Records Lefty'2004
- 2008 Russian Book of Records
