= Ioșia =

Coordinates: 47°03′N 21°53′E

Ioșia (Romanian pronunciation: [ˈjoʃi.a]; Hungarian: Őssi) is an outlying quarter (or district) in Oradea, Romania. It is a mix of both high-rise housing blocks built in Communist times as well as low-density housing. The quarter is an exurban environment — that is, in between a rural area and a suburban environment. It is located in the city's far southwest, and, although there is good infrastructure in terms of education, shopping, and, to some extent, transportation, the quarter still has a significant number of unpaved roads and country-style houses. Ioșia is usually divided into three areas: Ioșia Nord, Calea Aradului, and between those two, Ioșia Veche.

Of the three areas of Ioșia, Ioșia Nord is the most developed, having 2 high schools, 1 kindergarten, 1 swimming pool, many supermarkets and a direct transportation line to the University of Oradea (being one of the two districts which have direct transportation to the University). It is also a beautiful place to take a walk, mainly because of the Crișul Repede river which separates Ioșia Nord from the Rogerius district.

On the current site of the Ioșia Swimming Pool Complex, there was a place called La Groapă, where people bathed near the Criș River due to the thermal water’s excellent healing properties. The investment was kept secret because it was too expensive to be approved by the authorities at the time, and it was carried out through patriotic labor, with local businesses also contributing everything necessary. Moreover, the project included an Olympic-size pool, but during construction, Nicolae Ceaușescu visited Oradea for a work-related visit. Fearing they would be discovered, the builders buried the pool. It was never uncovered, and one of the two main buildings of the swimming pool complex was built over it.

Calea Aradului, lying on the southern part of Oradea, is, as its name says, the way to Arad, another county in Romania. The Oradea Airport is located here, at the town exit.

Ioșia Veche (Old = Vechi in Romanian) is entirely composed of houses, being the only one of the three areas with some unpaved roads.

The quarter is one of the most beautiful in Oradea because it maintains a rustic, rural feel which still being relatively built-up and close to the city. For tourists, it provides insight into Romanian country life while still being in the city close to all the excellent facilities that Oradea is home to. In Oradea, there is a stereotype about people from Ioșia as being fairly uneducated in comparison to more inner-city urbanites, even though this is changing fast as real estate prices are increasing in the city centre and wealthy people are building large houses (villas) in Ioșia. This neighborhood, is used to belong to the actual Santandrei village, most of the elders living in the area of Ioșia are former Sântandrei village residents.
