= Fyodor Romodanovsky =

Subordinate of Tsar Peter the Great and the First Head of the Russian Secret Police

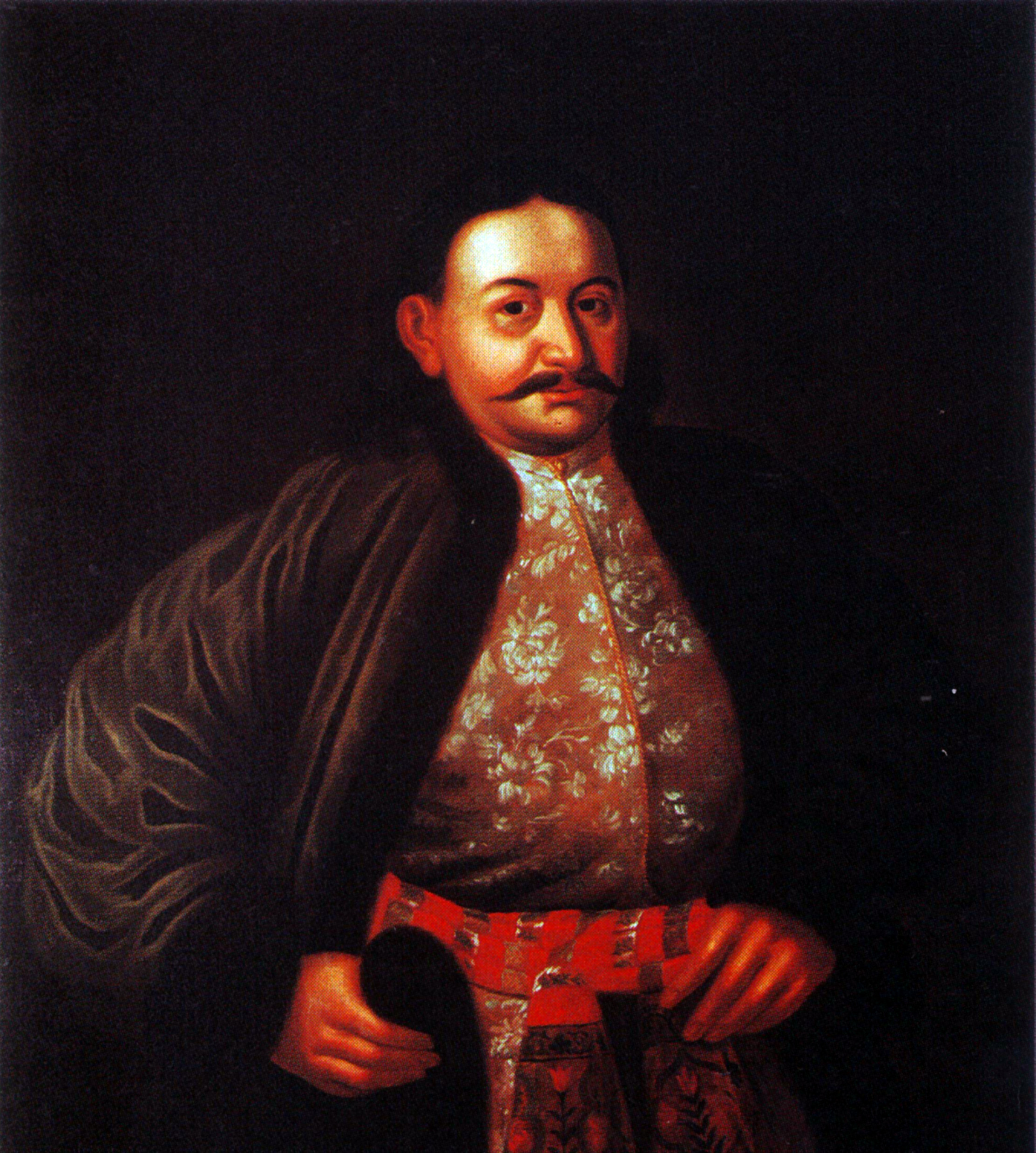
Prince Caesar Feodor Y. Romodanovsky (1640–1717)

Prince Fyodor Yuryevich Romodanovsky (Russian: Фёдор Юрьевич Ромодановский; ca. 1640 – 1717) was a Russian aristocrat. He was one of Peter the Great's foremost assistants in the task of modernizing Russia. He served as the country's first head of secret police, operating the Preobrazhensky prikaz from 1686 to his death.

== Life ==
=== Early life ===
Believed to have been born around 1640, he was the only son of Prince Yuri Ivanovich Romodanovsky, a boyar and close associate of Tsar Alexis of Russia, and belonged to the Romodanovsky family, a branch of the Princes of Starodub which traditionally traced its ancestry to Rurik. His father’s position probably enabled Fyodor to enter the royal court while still young. In 1672, he was listed first among ten noblemen invited to the ceremonial banquet in the Palace of Facets celebrating the birth of the future Peter the Great. He subsequently held the court rank of blizhny stolnik, or close attendant to the tsar, and was recorded as a chamber stolnik in the Boyar Book in 1675 and again in 1678. In 1678, Romodanovsky received an early military command as the senior voivode of forces campaigning against the Ottoman Empire and was credited with defeating Ottoman and Crimean troops near Chyhyryn on 13 August, capturing their weapons and baggage.

=== 1680s to 1700 ===
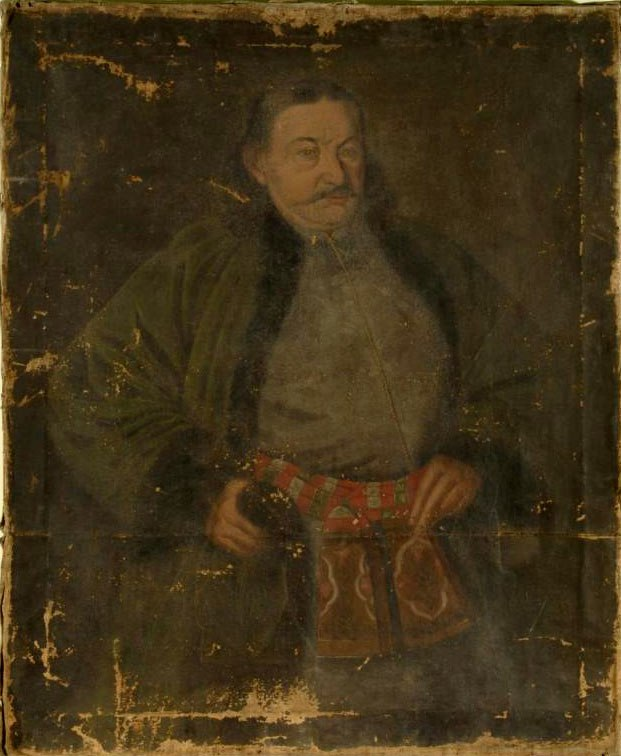
Fyodor Romodanovsky, 18th century depiction

Prince Fyodor was given the post of the head of the Preobrazhensky prikaz in 1686, when its functions involved the administration of the Preobrazhensky and Semyonovsky units. His integrity and resolution won him the admiration of young Tsar Peter (r. 1682–1725), who made him "Generalissimo" of his toy army.

During Peter’s prolonged absences from Moscow, Romodanovsky acted as one of the principal guardians of the Tsar’s authority governing Russia, most notably during the Grand Embassy of 1697–1698. Although routine government was formally entrusted to a council of senior boyars, Romodanovsky was placed in charge of internal security and was reportedly instructed to suppress any disorder without hesitation. His control of the Preobrazhensky Prikaz gave him authority over Peter’s guards, the administration of the royal establishments at Preobrazhenskoye and investigations concerning political opposition. Foreign diplomats consequently regarded him as the equivalent of a viceroy whenever the Tsar was absent.

Peter reflected this combination of genuine power and courtly theatre by styling Romodanovsky the “Prince Caesar”, addressing him as “Your Majesty” and presenting himself in correspondence as Romodanovsky’s obedient subject (кесарское величество and князь-кесарь). During the Streltsy uprising of 1698, Romodanovsky informed Peter of the developing unrest, while government forces defeated the mutineers near the New Jerusalem Monastery; he then participated in the initial investigation, suppressment and punishment of the rebels before Peter returned and ordered a much broader and more severe inquiry. Romodanovsky also had the right to keep his own court at Ropsha (south of Peterhof) and to promote officers. The Tsar addressed him in German as "Min Herr Koenig" ("My Lord King") and signed his own letters "Your Majesty's humblest servant Piter".

Following the outbreak of the Great Northern War in 1700, Romodanovsky’s principal contribution to Peter’s government was domestic administration and security rather than active military command. As Peter travelled between the war fronts, Moscow and the developing center of government at Saint Petersburg, Romodanovsky routinely presided over the central government during the Tsar’s absences from the capital. His position reflected Peter’s continued reliance upon members of the established Muscovite aristocracy, even while the tsar was introducing new institutions and administrative practices derived from western Europe. Romodanovsky’s most important continuing responsibility was his direction of the Preobrazhensky Prikaz which obtained almost exclusive jurisdiction over political cases and could question subjects regardless of their age, sex or social rank when they were suspected of treason or opposition to the sovereign. Romodanovsky demanded assistance from other government departments, summoned officials for interrogation and punished those who obstructed his investigations. Although the permanent staff of the office consisted of only a few clerks and assistants, he employed officers and soldiers of the Preobrazhensky and Semyonovsky Guards to deliver orders, make arrests and escort prisoners.

=== Later life ===
In 1703, Romodanovsky’s administrative responsibilities were extended when he was placed in charge of both the Siberian Prikaz and the Apothecary Prikaz, while remaining head of the Preobrazhensky Prikaz. He retained control of the political security apparatus even after Peter created the Governing Senate in 1711 to supervise administration during the sovereign’s absences.

Romodanovsky remained head of the Preobrazhensky Office until his death from gangrene on 17 September 1717, when his son Ivan Fyodorovich Romodanovsky succeeded him both as head of the office and as “Prince Caesar”. Peter, who was abroad when the elder Romodanovsky died, wrote to Ivan offering his condolences and assuring him that he had not forgotten his father’s services.

== Legacy ==
Long after Romodanovsky's death, Klyuchevsky (1841-1911) described him as a "a monstrum by appearance, a vicious tyrant by character".

Most of Peter the Great's biographies tend to overlook the role of Romodanovsky, who served as an unconditional supporter of Peter and as a feared and effective official.

Fyodor Romodanovsky's only son, Ivan Fyodorovich Romodanovsky (c. 1677–1730) succeeded him in office at the Preobrazhensky prikaz from 1717 to 1729.

== See also ==
- Preobrazhensky Regiment
