= Maria Cantemir =

Moldavian princess (1700–1754)

- Princess of Moldavia
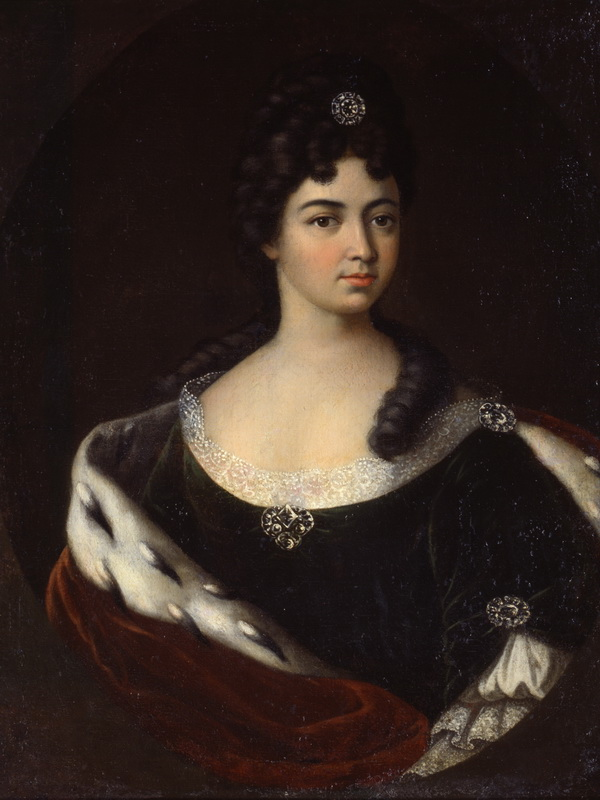
- Portrait by Ivan Nikitin, 1710s–1720s
- Born: Мария Дмитриевна Кантемир; 1700; Iași, Principality of Moldavia
- Died: 1754 (aged 53–54); Saint Petersburg, Russian Empire
- House: Cantemirești
- Father: Dimitrie Cantemir
- Mother: Cassandra Cantacuzino
- Occupation: Lady-in-waiting

Maria Dmitrievna Cantemirovna (Russian: Мария Дмитриевна Кантемир; 1700–1754) was a princess of Moldavia as the eldest daughter of Dimitrie Cantemir. She later lived in Russia, where she was a lady-in-waiting, salonist, and mistress of Emperor Peter I.

== Biography ==
Maria, born in Iași as the eldest daughter of the Dimitrie Cantemir, Prince of Moldavia and his first wife, Princess Cassandra Cantacuzino (1682–1713). By birth, she was member of the House of Cantemir.

From an early age, she received an excellent education. From 1711, she lived in exile in Russia, and in 1720, she became involved in a relationship with Tsar Peter. Maria followed Peter to Astrakhan in 1722, where she gave birth to a son by him. The child died in 1723, possibly poisoned by the physician of Empress Catherine.

Catherine regarded Maria as a threat and feared that Maria might replace her as empress. The relationship with Peter continued until his death in January 1725, when Catherine became the reigning empress and Maria was forced to leave court. She was a lady-in-waiting to Princess Natalia Alexeyevna in 1727–1728, and to Empress Anna Ivanovna in 1730–1731. From 1731 onward, she hosted a literary salon in Saint Petersburg.

The Swedish slave Lovisa von Burghausen mentions Maria in her autobiography. Burghausen, as the prisoner of Dimitrie Cantemir in 1713–1714, credited Maria and her sister Smaragda Catarina with saving her from freezing to death during a punishment by allowing her to sleep in their bedroom instead of in an unheated stone room in the middle of winter.
