= Nufărul =

District of Oradea, Bihor County, Romania

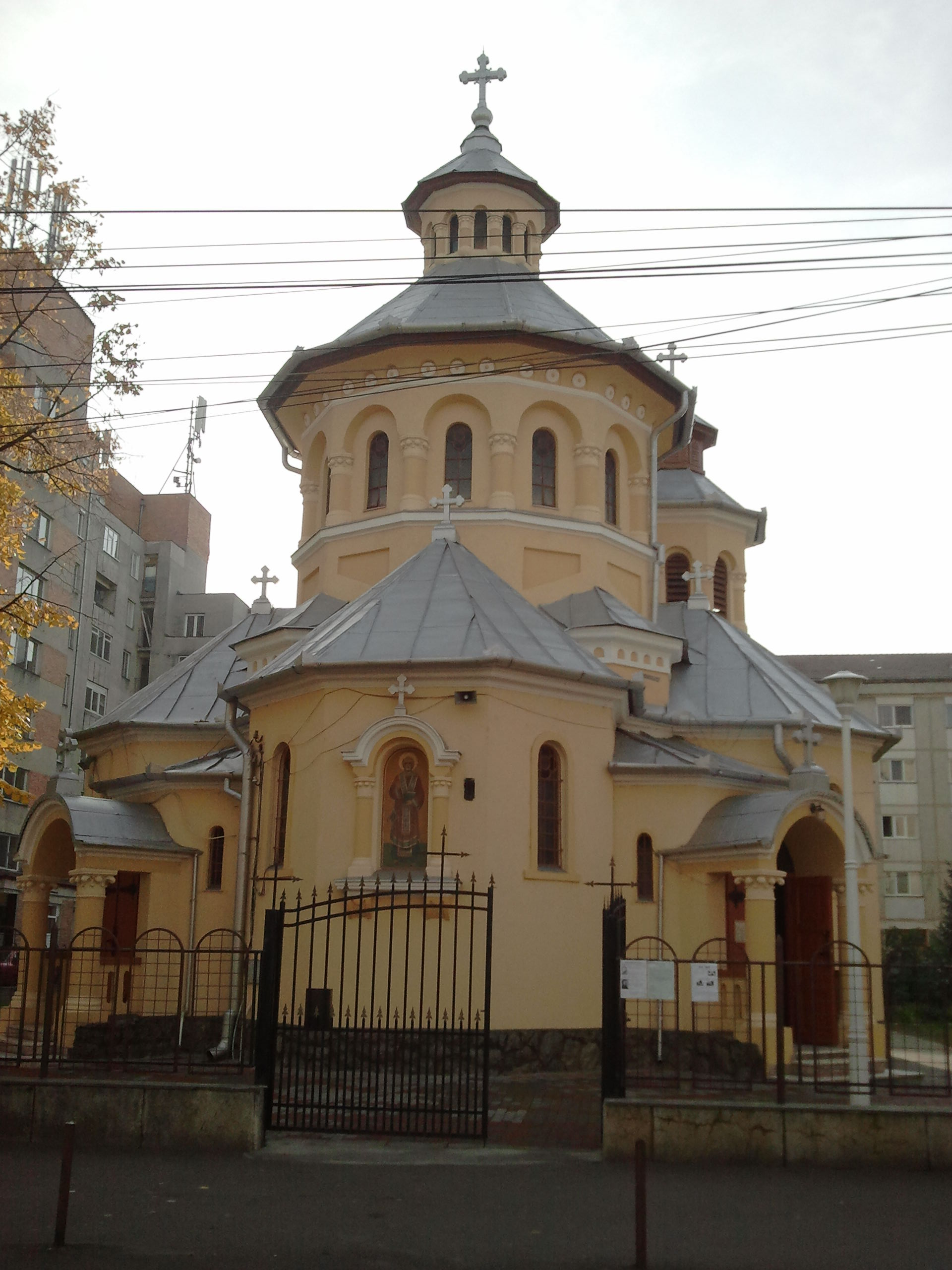
Nufărul Orthodox Church

Nufărul is a large "satellite" quarter (cartier in Romanian) on the eastern outskirts of Oradea, Bihor County, Romania. Like all other "quarters" of Oradea, Nufărul does not have an official boundary, nor does it have a local government (being governed by the Municipality of Oradea).

The name Nufărul means water lily in Romanian. The name for the quarter came from the fact, that, in this area, there are many water lilies, the area extending up until Băile Felix, the thermal resort, where there are beautiful lakes with water lilies.

== History ==
Initially a separate locality from the city of Oradea, today’s Nufărul neighborhood is situated on the territory of the former village of Seleuș, which in the second half of the 19th century included Bumbacului, Constantin Noica, and Nufărului streets—streets that still exist today. At that time, the village had two connections to the city: Dimitrie Cantemir and Seleușului alleys.

Only after the Great Union, when the areas where the settlements of Seleuș were located expanded, were steps taken to make the locality part of the city of Oradea. After the construction of the first blocks, in the 1970s, the old Seleuș lost many of its past components. Over time, more and more blocks were built, extending to the Nufărul II area (Nufărului street, towards the exit from the city).

Until the mid-20th century, trams were used to reach this area, and after that the first buses were introduced. After 2002, continuous expansion changed the industrial role of the neighborhood to commercial, residential, logistical, etc.

== Infrastructure and services ==
Nufărul is referred to as a "satellite" quarter because it is located at the edge of the Oradea municipality and features a range of infrastructure similar to that of Oradea city centre, including a transport hub, supermarkets and other commercial facilities, and high-density apartment blocks.

After the Oradea city centre (Centru) and Rogerius, it is the third-largest district for business in Oradea. It is also one of the fastest-growing areas in Bihor county in terms of development and foreign investment, due to its location on the E60 Budapest–Bucharest highway, the quarter being the first point of contact with Oradea when arriving from Bucharest, Cluj-Napoca, and other major Romanian cities.

A piece of trivia used as a sign of Nufărul's rise as an important centre for foreign investment is that the quarter was the location of the second McDonald's (McDrive) restaurant in the Municipality of Oradea.

However, despite having a wide range of infrastructure, Nufărul was, like Rogerius, built-up mainly during Romania's Communist period, which ended as a result of the Romanian Revolution of 1989. For that reason, the quarter is said by many to lack the historical charm of central Oradea, instead being filled by planned and mostly unaesthetic Communist-era apartment blocks and buildings.

== Transport ==
Nufărul is an important transport hub for the Oradea Transport Local network. The quarter is accessible by tram and bus from the city centre, and is a terminus for one of the city's three tram lines, as well as various bus lines. It is also the gateway to Băile Felix, a well-known spa resort outside Oradea, with several shuttle bus connections to the resort.
