= Velența =

District of Oradea, Bihor County, Romania

Coordinates: 47°03′N 21°56′E

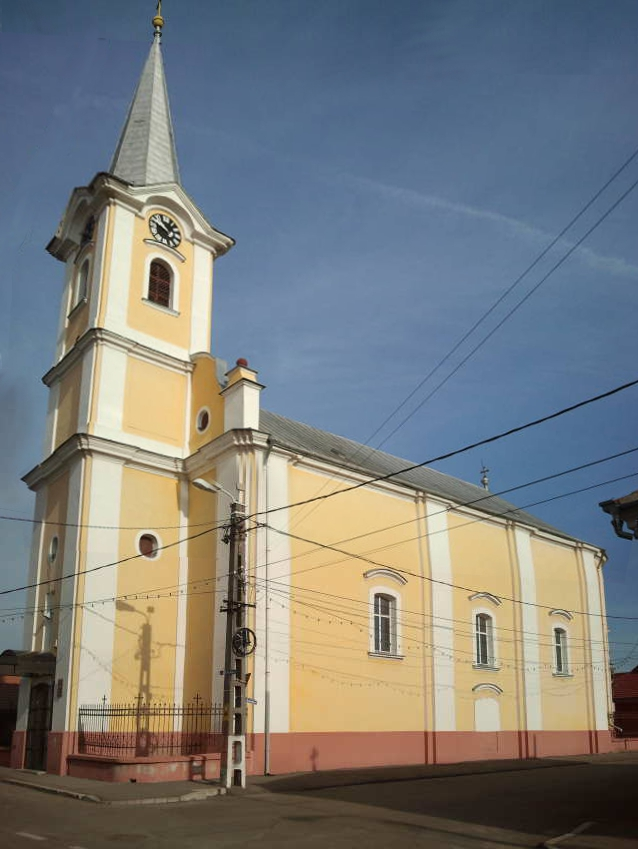
Velența Orthodox Church

Velența (Romanian pronunciation: [veˈlentsa], Hungarian: Váradvelence) is a quarter, or district, in eastern Oradea, Romania. The quarter is crossed by the E60 European Road, and has retained many of its old buildings, escaping the massive Communist urbanisation programme.

== History ==
Its name Velence means Venice in Hungarian, as this settlement served as the home for the Venetian builders who worked on the expansion of the Fortress. It was legally considered a separate town until 1872, when it merged with Orașu Nou (Hungarian: Várad-Újváros), Olosig (Hungarian: Várad-Olaszi), and Subcetate (Hungarian: Várad-Váralja) to form Nagyvárad (Oradea-Mare).

The only two medieval urban places of worship in Oradea are located in Velența. These are the Franciscan order's church and monastery, affected by the renovation of Oradea Maternity Hospital in 1989, and a Gothic church located near the Eastern Mill, on the current Miron Costin Street. Additionally, the Orthodox church dedicated to the Holy Archangels Michael and Gabriel is one of the oldest Orthodox places of worship in Oradea, having been built between 1768 and 1779 on the site of an old wooden church.
