= Constantine Ducas (Moldavian ruler) =

Prince of Moldavia (1st reign)
- Reign: 23 April 1693 – 18 December 1695
- Predecessor: Dimitrie Cantemir
- Successor: Antioh Cantemir

Prince of Moldavia (2nd reign)
- Reign: 12 September 1700 – 26 July 1703
- Predecessor: Antioh Cantemir
- Successor: Antioh Cantemir
- Born: unknown
- Died: 1704; Istanbul
- Father: George Ducas
- Mother: Nastasia
- Religion: Orthodox

Constantine Ducas (Greek: Κωνσταντίνος Δούκας, Kōnstantínos Doúkas; Romanian: Constantin Duca; ? – 1704) son of George Ducas, was a Voivode (Prince) of Moldavia.
