= Antiochus Kantemir =

Moldavian diplomat (1708–1744)

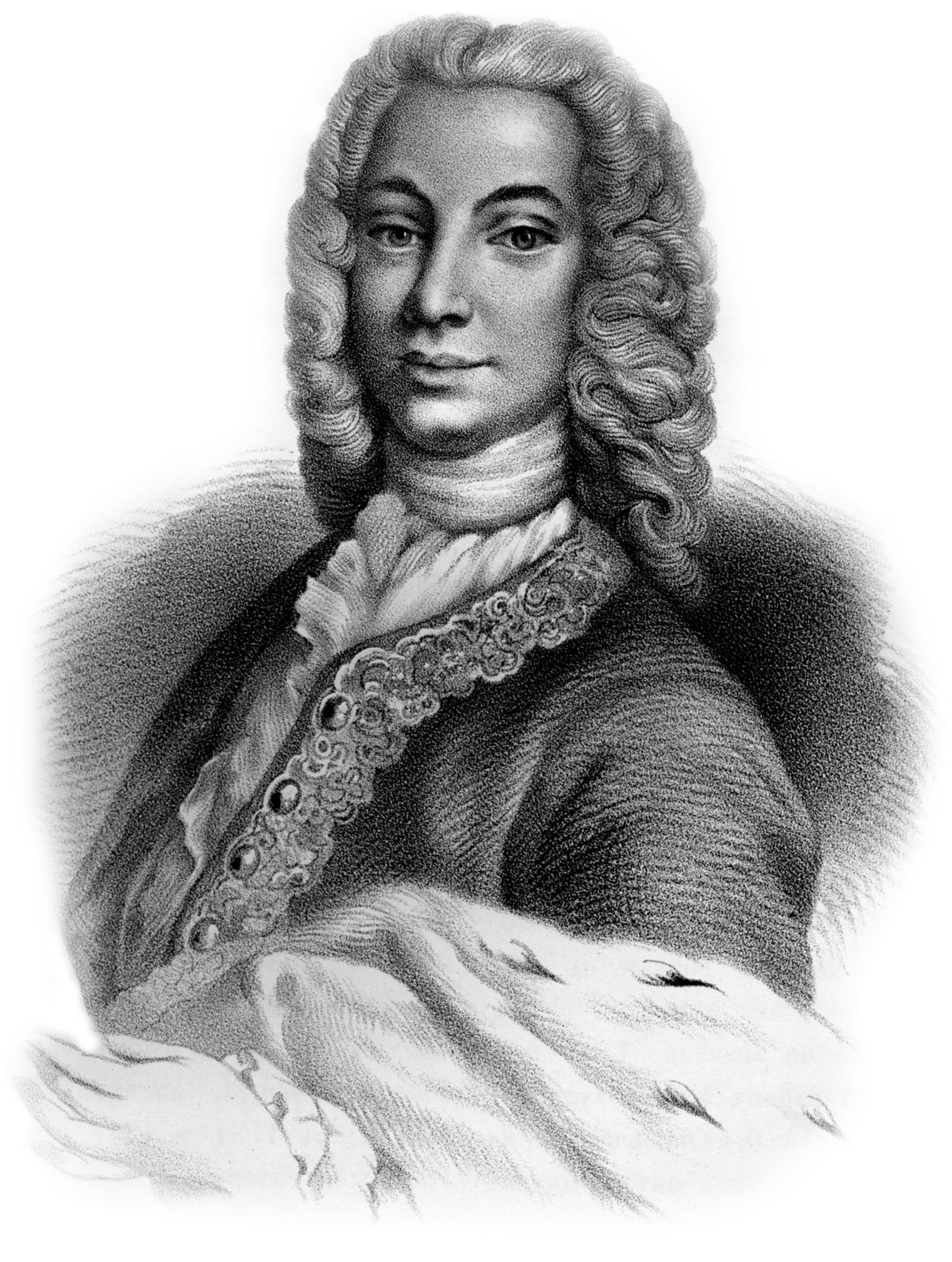
Litograph by Pyotr Borel, 1864-1869

Antiochus or Antioch Kantemir or Cantemir (Russian: Антиох Дмитриевич Кантемир, romanized: Antiokh Dmitrievich Kantemir; Romanian: Antioh Cantemir; Turkish: Antioh Kantemiroğlu; French: Antioche Cantemir; 8 September 1708 – 31 March 1744) was a Moldavian who served as a man of letters, diplomat, and prince during the Russian Enlightenment. He has been called "the father of Russian poetry".

== Life ==
Kantemir was born into a noble Moldavian family at Iași on 8 September 1708. His illiterate grandfather Constantin had been made voivode of Moldavia by the Ottomans in 1685 and was succeeded by his well-educated sons Antioch and Demetrius. Kantemir was the son of Demetrius by his wife, Princess Kassandra Cantacuzene, who claimed descent from the Byzantine dynasty of the same name. He spent much of his youth in Constantinople as a hostage to the Turks. He was then educated by his father and at the St Petersburg Academy before moving to the family estate near Dmitrovsk.

He served as the Russian ambassador at London from 1731 to 1736, when he was relocated to Paris to serve as Russia's minister plenipotentiary to the Kingdom of France. There, he became a noted intellectual and a close friend of Montesquieu and Voltaire. Kantemir died a bachelor in Paris amid litigation concerning his illegitimate children.

== Work ==
Considered "the father of Russian poetry", Kantemir used his classical education to assist Peter the Great's programme of modernizing and westernizing Russian culture. His most noticeable effort in this regard is his Petrida, an unfinished epic glorifying the emperor. He produced a tract on old Russian versification in 1744 and numerous odes and fables. His use of gallic rhyme schemes can make his work seem antiquated and awkward to modern readers.

He edited his father's History of the Growth and Decay of the Ottoman Empire in England and wrote a biography and bibliography of his father which later accompanied its 1756 edition. His 1742 Letters on Nature and Man (O Prirode i Cheloveke) was a philosophical work. He is best remembered for his satires in the manner of Juvenal, including To My Mind: On Those Who Blame Education and On the Envy and Pride of Evil-Minded Courtiers, which were among the first such works in the Russian language.

Kantemir translated Horace and Anacreon into Russian, as well as Algarotti's Dialogues on Light and Colors. He also translated De Fontenelle's Conversations on the Plurality of Worlds, in 1730. When Kantemir's teacher, Christopher Gross, asked the academy to publish the translation, the responsible manager of the chancellery, Johann Daniel Schumacher, wanted to first get permission from the government and the Holy Synod. Correspondence regarding the matter dragged on until 1738, when permission to publish was finally given, but the book was not published until 1740.

Kantemir's own works were translated into French by the Abbé Guasco, who also penned his biography.
