= Cantemirești =

Tatar origin Moldavian ruling boyar family

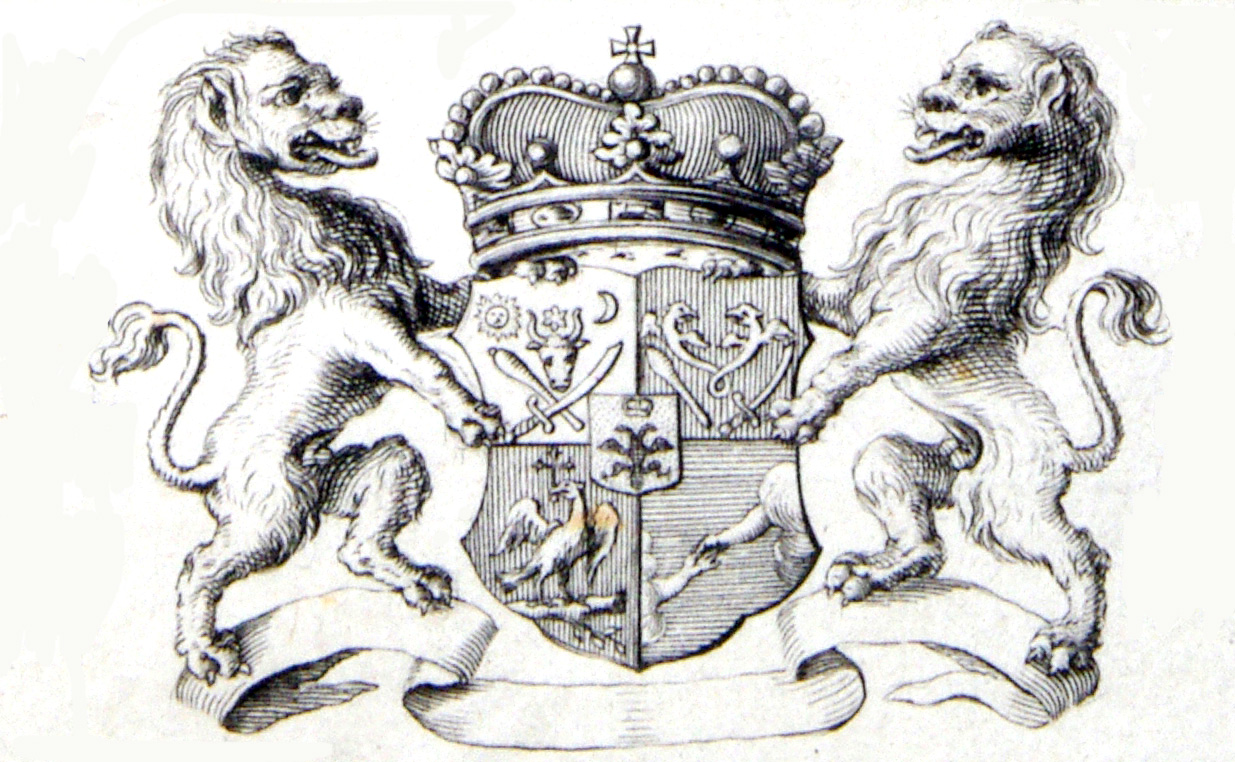
Coat of arms of Princes Cantemir

The House of Cantemirești or House of Cantemir was a Moldavian ruling boyar family.

== History ==
The family was of Greek origin, speaking the Greek language natively. Demetrie Cantemir referred to a promise made by the Tsar of Russia that Cantemir, due to his Byzantine Greek imperial descent, would be declared Emperor of the Greeks after Constantinople was taken. The family also tended to speak Italian fluently, with some exceptions, as did most of the educated nobility in Moldavia.

The Cantemirești are considered to have been "proto-Phanariot"; in the 17th and 18th centuries it brought forth several Voivodes of Moldavia. On 21 August 1723, the family got the title Prince of the Holy Roman Empire from Emperor Charles VI. During 18th century, they moved to Russia, Great Britain and France.

== Notable members ==
- Constantin Cantemir (died 1693), Voivode of Moldavia
- Antioh or Antioch Cantemir (died 1726), son of Constantin, Voivode of Moldavia
- Dimitrie or Demetrius Cantemir (died 1723), son of Constantin, Voivode of Moldavia and a prolific man of letters
- Antiochus or Antioch Cantemir (died 1744), son of Demetrius Cantemir, man of letters and Russian diplomat
- Anastasiya Trubetskaya (1700-1755), wife of Dimitrie Cantemir
- Ekaterina Dmitrievna Golicyna (died 1761), daughter of Dimitrie Cantemir, Russian noblewoman and Maid of honor

== See also ==
- Gantimurov family
- Kantemirovka
- Khan Temir
