= Dimitrie Cantemir =

Moldavian statesman and prince (1673–1723)

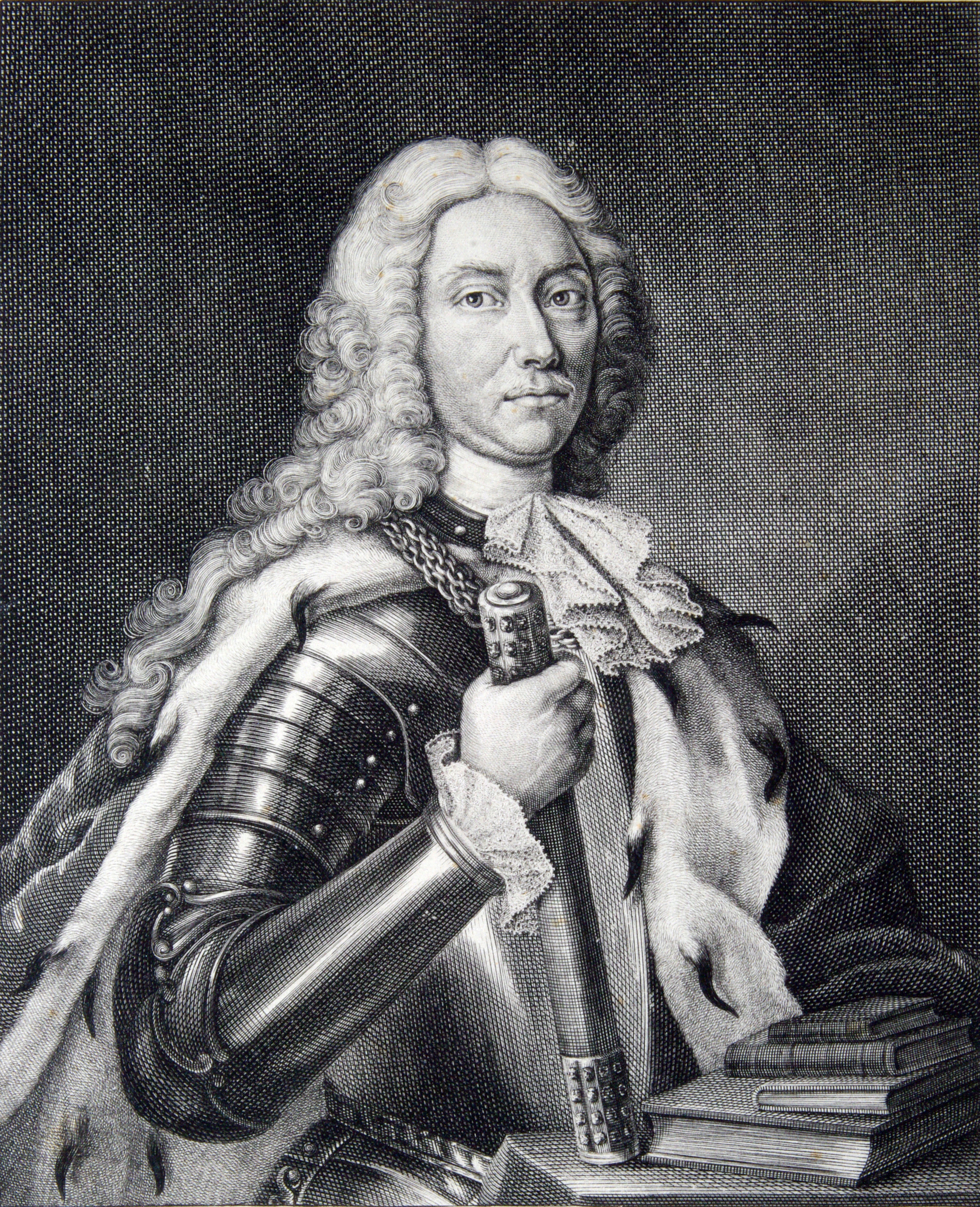
- Portrait from the first edition of the Descriptio Moldaviae, 1716

Prince of Moldavia
- Reign: March 1693 – April 1693
- Predecessor: Constantin Cantemir
- Successor: Constantin Duca
- Reign: January 1710 – August 1711
- Predecessor: Nicholas Mavrocordatos
- Successor: Lupu Costachi
- Born: 26 October 1673; Silișteni (now Dimitrie Cantemir), Vaslui County, Principality of Moldavia
- Died: 21 August 1723 (aged 49); Dmitrovsk, Oryol Oblast, Russian Empire
- Burial: Trei Ierarhi Monastery, Iași
- Spouse: Casandra Cantacuzino; Anastasiya Trubetskaya
- Issue: Matei; Șerban; Maria Cantemir; Constantin; Antiochus Kantemir; Ekaterina Golitsyna
- House: Cantemirești
- Father: Constantin Cantemir

Dimitrie or Demetrius Cantemir (Romanian pronunciation: [diˈmitri.e kanteˈmir]; Russian: Дмитрий Кантемир, romanized: Dmitry Kantemir; 26 October 1673 – 21 August 1723), also known by other spellings, was a Moldavian prince, statesman, and man of letters. He twice served as voivode of Moldavia (March–April 1693 and 1710–1711). During his second term, he allied his state with Russia in a war against Moldavia's Ottoman overlords; Russia's defeat forced Cantemir's family into exile and the replacement of the native voivodes by Greek phanariots. Cantemir was also a prolific writer, variously a: philosopher, historian, composer, musicologist, linguist, ethnographer and geographer. His son, Antioch, Russia's ambassador to Great Britain and France and a friend of Montesquieu and Voltaire, would become known as "the father of Russian poetry".

== Name ==
Dimitrie is the Romanian form of the name Latinized as Demetrius and, less often, anglicized as Demeter. The Russian form of his name was Dmitri Konstantinovich Kantemir (Дми́трий Константи́нович Кантеми́р). He is also known as Dimitri Kantemiroğlu in Turkish contexts, Dymitr Kantemir in Polish, and Dēmētrios Kantimērēs (Δημήτριος Καντιμήρης) in Greek. His surname Cantemir (Kantemir) is of Turkic/Tatar origin, "kan" meaning "blood" and "temir" meaning "iron".

== Life ==
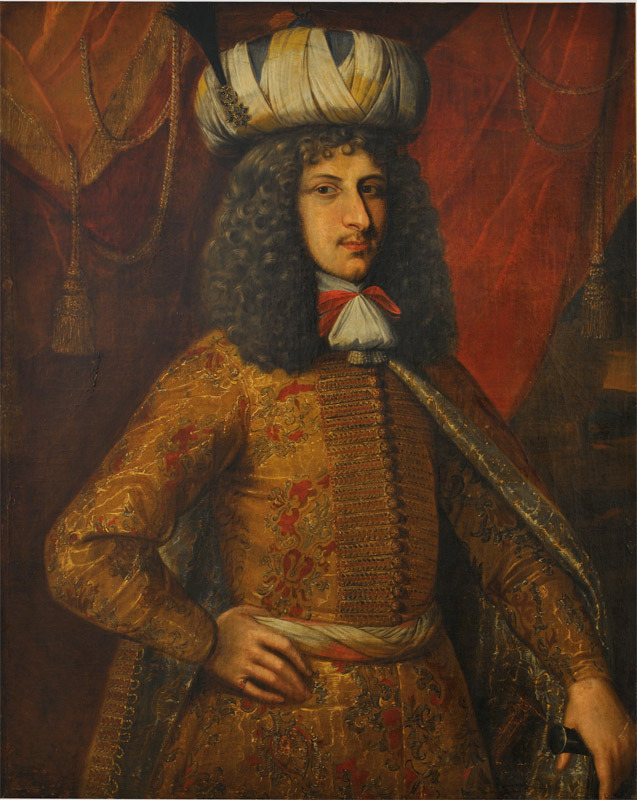
In Ottoman dress

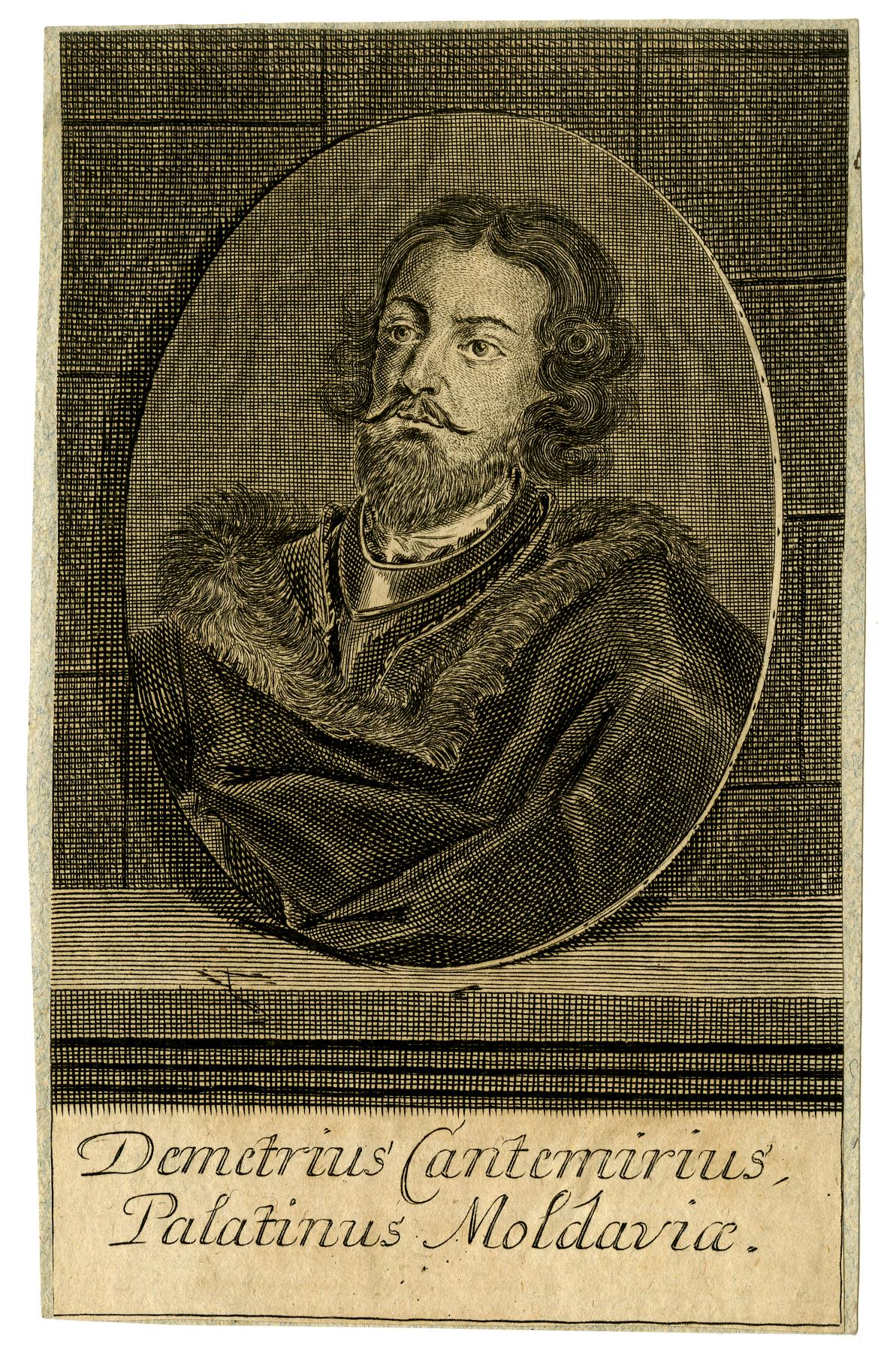
Portrait engraving, about 1710

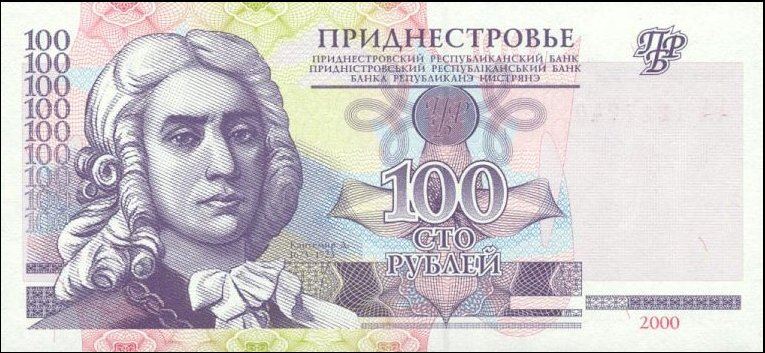
On the 100 Transnistrian ruble note

Dimitrie was born in Silişteni, Moldavia (now Vaslui County, Romania) on 26 October 1673 to Constantin Cantemir and Ana Bantăș. His mother was a learned daughter of a local noble family. In 1685, Constantin was named voivode of Moldavia by its Turkish overlords.

Although Constantin himself was illiterate, he educated his sons Dimitrie and Antioh thoroughly. Dimitrie learned Greek and Latin to read the classics as a child. One of his tutors was the scholar John Komnenos Molyvdos. Between 1687 and 1710, Dimitrie spent most of his time as a hostage or envoy in Constantinople, living in the palace he owned, where he learned Turkish and studied Ottoman history at the Patriarchate's Greek Academy. While there, he also composed Ottoman music.

Upon Constantin's death in 1693, Dimitrie briefly succeeded him to the voivodeship but was passed over within three weeks in favour of Constantin Duca, whose candidacy was supported by his father-in-law, the Wallachian voivode Constantin Brâncoveanu. When his brother Antioh eventually succeeded to the control of Moldavia, Dimitrie served as his envoy to the Porte. During these years, he also served with distinction in the Turkish army on its campaigns.

In 1710, Dimitrie was appointed voivode in his own right. Believing Ottoman Turkey to be collapsing, he placed Moldavia under Russian control through a secret agreement signed at Lutsk (Treaty of Lutsk). Then he joined Peter the Great in his war against the Turks. This ended in failure at Stănilești (18–22 July 1711) and the Cantemirs were forced into Russian exile. In 1712, Peter I presented Bogorodskoye District (Black Mud) to the former Moldavian ruler.

He travelled to Russia along with many other noble families, most important and close being Septilici family and Abaza, who were also made princely/noble in Russian ranks. Dimitrie was made both a Russian prince (knyaz) by Peter and a prince of the Holy Roman Empire by Charles VI. He lived on an estate at Dmitrovka near Oryol, with a sizable boyar retinue (including the chronicler Ion Neculce). There he died on 21 August 1723, on the very day he was awarded his German title. In 1935, his remains were returned to Iași.

== Family ==
Cantemir was married twice: to Princess Cassandra Cantacuzino (1682–1713), daughter of Prince Șerban Cantacuzino and supposed descendant of the Byzantine Kantakouzenoi, in 1699, and to Princess Anastasiya Trubetskaya (1700–1755) in 1717. Cantemir's children were rather prominent in Russian history. His elder daughter Maria Cantemir (1700–1754) so attracted Peter the Great that he allegedly planned to divorce his wife Catherine to be with her. Upon Catherine's own ascension to the throne, however, Maria was forced to enter a convent. Cantemir's son Antioch (1708–1744) was the Russian ambassador at London and Paris, a friend of Voltaire and Montesquieu, and so influential a poet, satirist, and essayist as to be considered "the father of Russian poetry". Another son Constantin (1703–1747) was implicated in the Golitsyn conspiracy against the empress Anna and was exiled to Siberia. Dimitrie's younger daughter Smaragda (1720–1761), reckoned one of the great beauties of her time, was the wife of Prince Dmitriy Mikhailovich Golitsyn and a friend of the empress Elizabeth.

== Historical works ==
Cantemir was a polyglot known as one of the greatest linguists of his time, speaking and writing eleven languages. Well-versed in Oriental scholarship, his oeuvre is voluminous, diverse, and original, although some of his scientific writings contain unconfirmed theories or simple inaccuracies. Between 1711 and 1719 he wrote his most important creations. In 1714, he was named a member of the Royal Academy of Berlin.

Cantemir's best-known history work was his History of the Growth and Decay of the Ottoman Empire (the original title was in Latin, Historia incrementorum atque decrementorum Aulae Othomanicae). This volume circulated throughout Europe in manuscript for a number of years. It was finally printed in 1734 in London and was later translated and printed in Germany and France. It remained the seminal work on the Ottoman Empire up to the middle of the 19th century; notably, it was used as a reference for Edward Gibbon's own Decline and Fall of the Roman Empire. Later scholarship contests many points owing to the dubiousness of some of Cantemir's sources.

He also published the first critical history of Romania as a whole, the Chronicle of the Antiquity of the Romano-Moldavo-Wallachians (Hronicul vechimei a romano-moldo-vlahilor), from 1719 to 1722. It asserted the Latin origin of the Romanian language and the Roman origin of the people living within the former land of Dacia.

Cantemir wrote his Descriptio Moldaviae ("Description of Moldavia" in Latin) in 1714 at the request of the Royal Academy in Berlin. Covering geographical, ethnographical, and economic aspects of Moldavia, it was similarly circulated in manuscript and only published much later. It appeared in a German geographical magazine in 1769 and was published as a book in 1771. His c. 1714 manuscript map of Moldova was the first real map of the country, containing geographical detail as well as administrative information. Printed in 1737 in the Netherlands, it formed the basis of most European maps of the country for decades.

His 1705 roman à clef A Hieroglyphic History was the first Romanian novel, representing the history of the Wallachian Brâncoveanu and Cantacuzino dynasties through allegorical and mythological animals.

He also wrote an introduction to Islam for Europeans, a biography of Jan Baptist van Helmont, a philosophical treatise in Romanian and Greek, and an unfinished second treatise on the Undepictable Image of Sacred Science.

Due to his works, he was renowned by the high courts of Europe. His name is among those who were considered to be the brightest minds of the world on a plaque at the Library of Sainte-Genevieve in Paris, next to those of Leibniz, Newton, Piron, and others.

== Musical works ==
A few of Cantemir's roughly forty Ottoman compositions are still performed today as part of the Turkish repertoire, but his greatest service was in preserving 350 traditional instrumental pieces by publishing them in a musical notation he developed from the Ottoman Turkish alphabet in his work Edvar-i Musiki, offered as a present to Sultan Ahmed III in 1703 or 1704 and recently reprinted with modern explanations.

In 1999, the Bezmara ensemble recorded Yitik Sesin Peşinde ("In Search of the Lost Sound") from the Cantemir transcriptions using period instruments. His compositions, those of his European contemporaries and Moldavian folk music of the period were explored on Cantemir (Golden Horn Records, 2000) performed by İhsan Özgen and the Lux Musica ensemble under Linda Burman-Hall's direction. Seven of Cantemir's compositions were also featured on Hespèrion XXI's 2009 Istanbul, under the direction of Jordi Savall, with focus on Cantemir's “Book of the Science of Music”.

== Istanbul Museum ==
One of the houses inhabited by Dimitrie Cantemir during his exile in Constantinople was restored and opened as a museum in 2007. It lies in the Fener quarter of the walled city between Phanar College and the Golden Horn.

Preceded by Constantin Cantemir	Prince/Voivode of Moldavia; 1693	Succeeded by Constantin Duca
Preceded by Nicolae Mavrocordat	Prince/Voivode of Moldavia; 1710–1711	Succeeded by Caimacam Lupu Costachi
