= Rogerius, Oradea =

District of Oradea, Bihor County, Romania

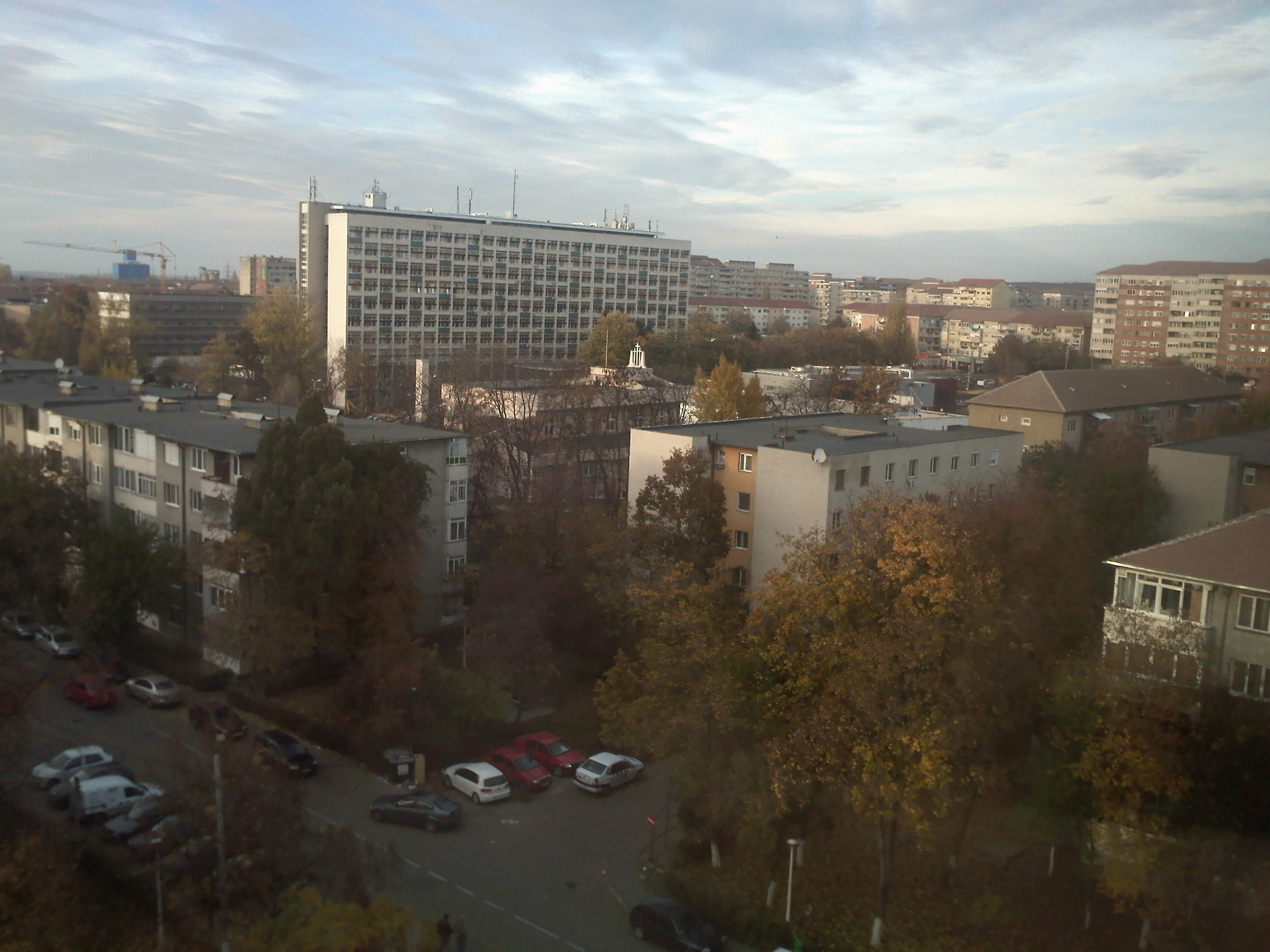
RogeriusDistrict

Rogerius (Hungarian: Rogériusz) is a district or quarter (cartier in Romanian) of Oradea, the largest city of Bihor County, Romania. It was named after Rogerius of Apulia, a bishop from the 13th century.

Despite Oradea not being very large, Rogerius is usually regarded as a 'satellite-city' in its own right, due in part to its location at the western end of the city proper, near the border town of Borş, on the Hungarian border. Also, it is city's largest and most populated district other than the city centre, being home to many blocks of flats, as well as a large market. In the year 2017 Rogerius housed approximately 50.000 inhabitants, roughly a quarter of the city's entire population.

It is also the first sign of Oradea visitors will see when coming from Western Europe or Hungary via Borş and European road E60.

The western area of Rogerius contains a series of factories from Communist times, one of the most prominent being Sinteza, but also recently created industrial parks, where a few corporations opened new offices, taking advantage of Oradea's proximity to the border.

== Transport ==
Rogerius is accessible by tram from the city centre and other parts of Oradea, as well as by bus. Tram lines crossing the district are 1R, 1N, 3R, 3N, also these lines connect to the other parts of the city. There are many bus lines going through Rogerius also. Some trams go further to the factories region linking the district with the developing industrial parks, where many businesses perform their activity. Driving through Rogerius can be done on many major arteries, the road conditions are good and the links between different points inside the district are well established.

Major arteries of the district:

Dacia Boulevard

Transilvaniei Boulevard

Stefan Cel Mare Boulevard

Corneliu Coposu Street

== Services ==
Having the largest density population in Oradea, the district is an important center for investment. The Rogerius market is the biggest and most flourishing one in the city, beating in many ways the central market known as Piata Cetatii. Rogerius also has the biggest playground in the city and the most parks.
