= Antioh Cantemir =

Moldavian noble

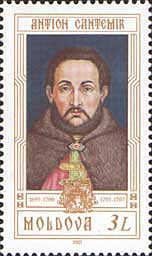

Prince of Moldavia 1st reign
- Reign: 18 December 1695 – 12 September 1700
- Predecessor: Constantine Ducas
- Successor: Constantine Ducas

2nd reign
- Reign: 23 February 1705 – 31 July 1707
- Predecessor: Mihai Racoviță
- Successor: Mihai Racoviță
- Born: 4 December 1670
- Died: 1726 (aged 55–56); Golia Monastery
- Dynasty: Cantemirești
- Father: Constantin Cantemir
- Religion: Orthodox

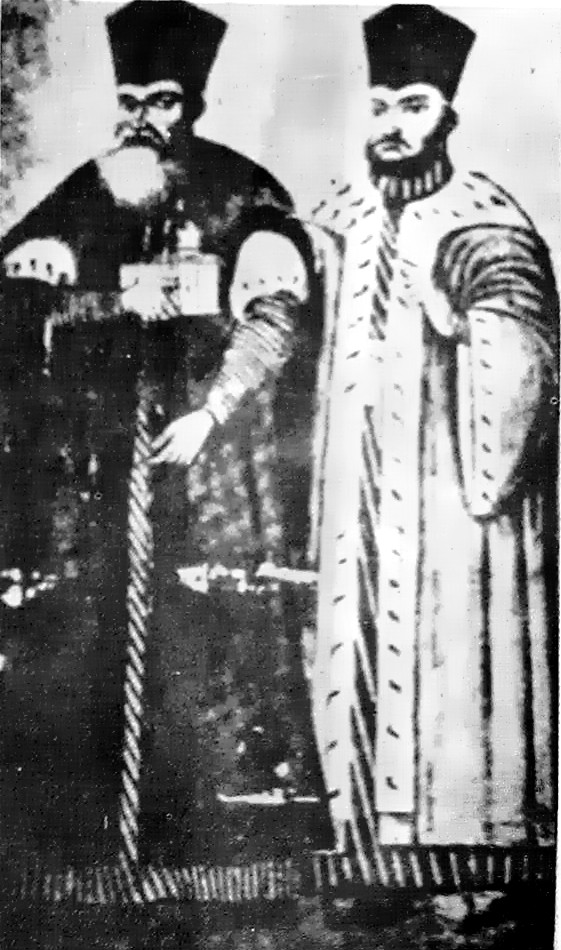
Constantin and Antioh Cantemir

Antioh Cantemir (4 December 1670 – 1726), better known in English by the anglicized form Antioch Cantemir, was a Moldavian noble who ruled as voivode of Moldavia (18 December 1695 – 12 September 1700 and 23 February 1705 – 31 July 1707).

== Life ==
Antioch was born into a noble Moldavian family of Tatar origin. His illiterate father Constantin had been made voivode of Moldavia by the Ottomans in 1685. Constantin ensured his sons had a good education and, upon his death, Antioch's younger brother Demetrius notionally succeeded him. He was swiftly passed over by the Ottomans, however, in favor of Constantin Duca, who was supported by his father-in-law, the Wallachian voivode Constantin Brâncoveanu.

Duca was deposed after two years for late payments of tribute and for having executed an inspecting kapucu. Antioch began to rule but was eventually deposed through the machinations of the Wallachian voivode. Upon the return of Duca, the Cantemirs fled the country, returning to resume rule after Duca again fell into disgrace and lost Brâncoveanu's friendship. Antioch's second period of rule was preceded and followed by voivodeships of his brother-in-law Mihai Racoviță.

Unlike his father, Antioch did not oppose the interests of Poland. He also laid the groundwork for his brother's anti-Turkish alliance with Peter the Great's Russian Empire, which began expanding southward following the 1699 Treaty of Karlowitz. Despite Cantemir's high taxes, particularly during his second reign, he was a broadly popular figure and viewed as a just and kind ruler. Inspired by Chrysanthus, the Orthodox Patriarch of Jerusalem, he established the Princely Academy in his capital Iaşi in 1707.

He died in 1726 at Golia Monastery.

== See also ==
- Cantemir dynasty

== Notes ==
Preceded by Constantin Duca	Prince/Voivode of Moldavia; 1695–1700	Succeeded by Constantin Duca
Preceded by Mihai Racoviţă	Prince/Voivode of Moldavia; 1705–1707	Succeeded by Mihai Racoviţă
