= Sacred Band (1821) =

Greek military unit

- Ἱερὸς Λόχος
- Flag of the Sacred Band
- Active: February–August 1821
- Allegiance: Revolutionary Greece
- Type: Infantry
- Size: 400
- Engagements: Greek War of Independence: Battle of Galați; Wallachian Uprising; Battle of Drăgășani; Battle of Sculeni

Commanders
- Founder: Alexandros Ypsilantis
- Commander: Georgios Katakouzinos
- Adjutant: Athanasios Tsakalov

The Sacred Band (Greek: Ἱερὸς Λόχος) was a military force founded by Alexander Ypsilantis at the beginning of the Greek War of Independence, in the middle of March 1821 in Wallachia, now part of Romania. It was formed by volunteers students of the Greek communities of Moldavia, Wallachia and Odessa. It was the first organized military unit of the Greek War of Independence (1821) and of the Greek army in general. Ypsilantis thought that these young people could become the soul of his army. That was the reason that he borrowed the name of the Sacred Band of Thebes.

== Structure – Organization ==
In Focșani, after the completion of the training of the Sacred Band's members, oath taking ceremony was organized, according to the Tsarist etiquette. After the ceremony, Alexander Ypsilantis gave an enthusiastic speech and gave the flag of the Sacred Band to the commander of the Band, Georgios Kantakouzinos (Athanasios Tsakalov, one of the founders of the Filiki Eteria was the second in command). Thereafter the Sacred Band's members conducted a military parade singing the military song "Asma Polemistirion" (Άσμα Πολεμιστήριον) that was written by Adamantios Korais 20 years ago for the Greek Legion that fought in the French invasion of Egypt under Napoleon Bonaparte's command. At the beginning there were 120 members of the Sacred Band and then it reached the number of the 400 members, while the organization of the force was completed in Târgoviște.

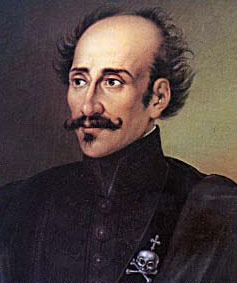
Alexandros Ypsilantis in Sacred Band's attire

== Uniform ==
The men of the Sacred Band wore uniforms inspired by the Black Brunswickers made of black wool felt. For that reason they were also called "melanophoroi" or "mavrophoroi" ("Black-wearers"). The Sacred Band uniform consisted of a long tunic, spatter dash and tall headgear, that according to Konstantinos Rados' description the headgear was similar to that of the Hussars. The headgear had a white plume and a tricolor (red, white, cyan) national coat of arms. Under this (frontally) there was a skull with 2 crossed bones of white metal, which was meaning Freedom or Death. A Sacred Band's member had a spearman rifle and a leather belt for the "palaska" (cartridge belt). The only known part of the Sacred Band's member's uniform is the one of Konstantinos Xenokratis (1803–1876), which is displayed in the National Historical Museum of Greece.

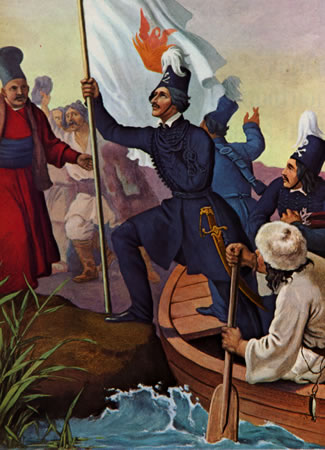
Alexander Ypsilantis crosses the Pruth, by Peter von Hess, Benaki Museum, Athens. Ypsilantis wears the uniform of the Sacred Band.

== Flag ==
The flag of the Sacred Band was tricolor. On the one side there was the inscription "ΕΝ ΤΟΥΤΩ ΝΙΚΑ" (In this sign, conquer), motto of the Roman emperor and founder of the Byzantine Empire Constantine the Great, who is also portrayed in the flag with his mother Helena of Constantinople in the fashion of Greek Orthodox iconography. On the other side there was the picture of a phoenix regenerated from the flames and the inscription "ΕΚ ΤΗΣ ΚΟΝΕΩΣ ΜΟΥ ΑΝΑΓΕΝΝΩΜΑΙ" (From my ashes I am reborn). In the paragraphs 11 and 12 of the military organization that was drafted by Nikolaos Ypsilantis, there was the follow instruction about the flag: “The Greek flag both in land and naval army must be composed by three colors: white, red and black. The white color means the innocence of this operation against the tyrants; the black color means our death for the country and freedom and the red color means the independence of Greek people and their pleasure to fight for the country’s resurrection”.

== Organization ==
Commander of the Sacred Band was Georgios Kantakouzinos, former senior officer of the tsarist army – who was soon discarded by Ypsilantis. Adjutant of the Sacred Band was Athanasios Tsakalov, cofounder of Filiki Eteria. Centurion of the Sacred Band was Spyridon Drakoulis, an actor from Ithaca, Dimitrios Soutsos from Istanbul, brother of the poet Alexandros Soutsos, Loukas Valsamakis from Kefalonia, Andronikos from Peloponnese, the Phanariot Alexandros Rizos, son of the prime minister of Moldavia Iakovos Rizos Neroulos, Rizos from Ioannina and Chiotis Ioannis Krokias.

Except from the Infantry section there was also the Cavalry with Hussar's and Cossack's uniforms. For the organization of the cavalry, a large amount of money was given by the prince of Moldavia, Michael Soutsos.

== Oath of Sacred Band ==
In Focșani, the students that had no previous military experience, started arm and spear training. Their oath taking took place in the temple of the city; “As a Christian orthodox and son of the Catholic church, I swear in the name of our Lord Jesus Christ and the Holy Trinity to be loyal to my Country and my Religion. I swear to be united with all my brothers for the freedom of our Country. I swear to bleed until death for my Religion and my Country. To kill my own brother if he is a traitor of our Country. To submit to our Country's leader. To not retreat if I don't repel the enemy of my Country and Religion. To fight when my Leader campaigns against the tyrants and to invite my friends to follow me. To hate and despise my enemies. To not give up until I see my Country free and my enemies dead. To spill my blood so that I can beat the enemies of my Religion or to die as a martyr for Jesus Christ. I swear in the name of Holy Communion that I will deprive her if I don't execute all of the promises that I gave in front of our Lord Jesus Christ".

== Battles fought ==
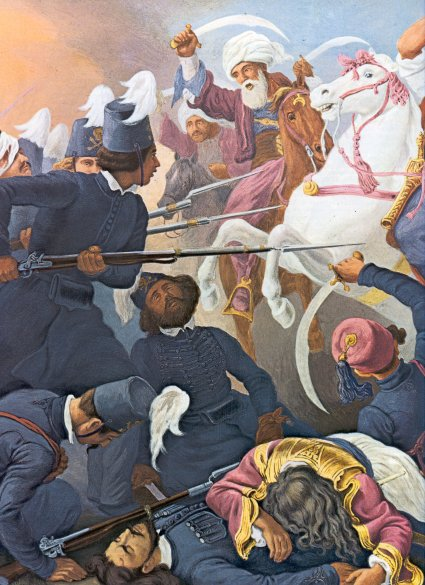
The Sacred Band in the Battle of Drăgășani

The unit participated in various battles fought against the Ottoman forces in the Wallachia, notably:

- Galați
- Slatina
- Sculeni
- Secu

Its largest engagement was the Battle of Drăgășani on 19 June 1821, where there was installed a powerful cavalry garrison of the Ottomans. After three days of march under bad weather conditions, the Sacred Band arrived across Drăgășani, where it encamped.

The next day (7 June 1821), before the complete arrival of the army, the skirmishes began. The result was the failed attack of the Greek cavalry under the command of Vasileios Karavias. The Sacred Band, headed by Nikolaos Ypsilantis, asked for help with 375 officers and soldiers but the flight of Karavias division forced the Sacred Band members to fight alone without the help of the cavalry. The Ottoman cavalry, headed by Kara Feiz, attacked before the Sacred Band's formation in squares. The Band was split into two parts and the battle was fierce. There have been many losses; the centurion, the Band's flag bearer, 25 officers and 180 soldiers died, while 37 Sacred Band's members were captured and were sent to Bucharest and then to Istanbul where they were beheaded. In a crucial phase of the battle, Giorgakis Olympios arrived and saved 136 members, including Nikolaos Ypsilantis and Athanasios Tsakalov, and the flag of the Sacred Band. Nikolaos Ypsilantis was saved by a French philhellene officer. Alexander Ypsilantis went to Râmnicu Vâlcea, where he wrote his last command on 8 June 1821, by which he stigmatized the betrayal of the political and military staff and praised the sacrifice of the Sacred Band; "You shadows of pure Hellenes and the Sacred Band, those who were betrayed, you were victims for the felicity of the country, accept the gratitude of your homogenous. A stele with your names written on her will be raised soon. The names of those who showed me faith and honesty are written with fiery letters in my heart. Their memory will always be the only drink of my soul".

== Monuments devoted to the Sacred Band ==
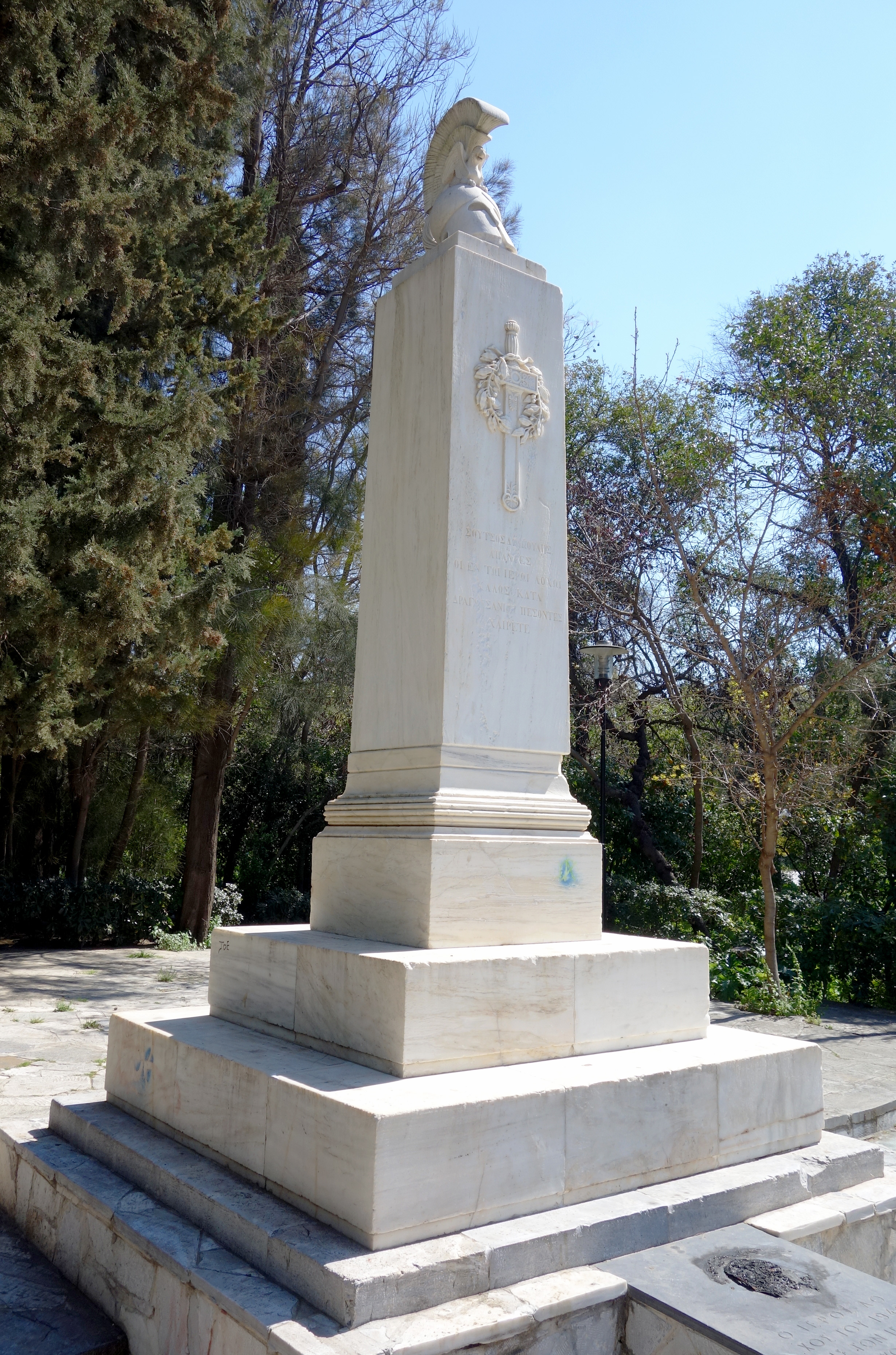
Monument in Pedion tou Areos by Stamatios Kleanthis

Despite its failure, the Sacred Band inspired the uprising in mainland Greece, which started in March 1821.

In Dragatsani's cemetery in Romania there is the Monument of the Deceased Sacred Band's members which was erected in 1884, an initiative by the editing committee of the Greek newspaper "Syllogoi" in Bucharest. The memorial was crafted in Pentelic marble by Chalepas and Lampaditis. It is 7 meters in height. On the front side of the pillar rises a 5-meter monolith with embossed cross on the crescent and under this the symbol of the Sacred Band's members. At the center of the pillar there is the inscription: “ΔΙΑΒΑΤΑ ΑΓΓΕΛΟΥ ΟΤΙ ΕΝΘΑΔΕ ΚΕΙΜΕΘΑ ΥΠΕΡ ΕΛΕΥΘΕΡΙΑΣ ΑΓΩΝΙΣΑΜΕΝΟΙ.”

The poet Alexandros Soutsos set another stele for the Sacred Band’s members, crafted by Leonidas Drosis, in the memory of his brother Dimitrios, the fallen centurion of the Sacred Band in 1845 northwest of the University. Since 1885 the stele was transferred near to the Holy Temple of Taxiarches in Pedion tou Areos, near to the Alexander Ypsilantis monument, which was crafted in 1869 by Drosis.

== Bibliography ==
- Clogg, R. The Movement for Greek Independence, Macmillan, 1976.
- Filimon, Timoleon. Δοκίμιον ιστορικόν περί της Ελληνικής Επαναστάσεως. Athens: Τύποις Σούτσα & Α. Κτενά, 1861.
- Fotinos, Elias. Οι Άθλοι της εν Βλαχία Επαναστάσεως το 1821 έτος, Εν Λειψία της Σακσονίας, 1846.
- Goldstein, Erik. Wars and Peace Treaties 1816–1991. Routledge, 1992.
- Miller, William. The Ottoman Empire and Its Successors, 1801–1927. Routledge, 1966.
- Rados, Konstantinos N. Ο Ιερός Λόχος και η εν Δραγατσανίω μάχη. Athens, Πανεπιστημιακή Επιθεώρησις, 1919.
- Zigouri, Nikoletta. Ο επενδύτης του ιερολοχίτη Κωνσταντίνου Ξενοκράτους. Τεκμήρια Ιστορίας Μονογραφίες 2011, Historical and Ethnological Society of Greece, p. 53–70, 2011.
