= Konstantinos Xenokratis =

Greek revolutionary

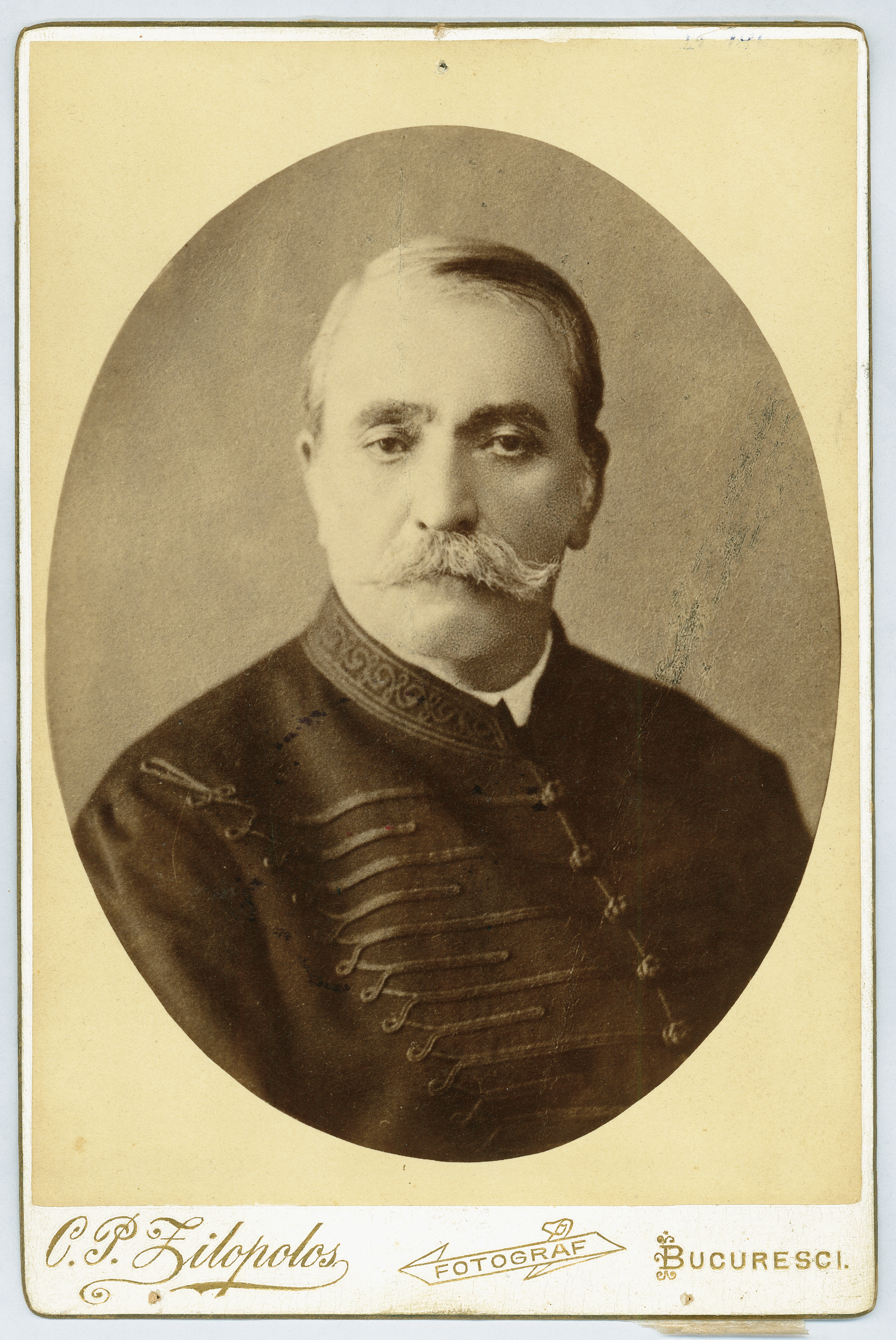

Konstantinos Xenokratis (Greek: Κωνσταντίνος Ξενοκράτης; 1803–1876) was a Greek revolutionary and benefactor from Eastern Thrace. He participated in the Greek War of Independence as a member of the Sacred Band.

== Biographical information ==
Xenokratis was born in Samakovo of Eastern Thrace. At a young age, he moved to Bucharest with his brothers, Paschalis, Theodoros and Athanasios. There they engaged in business and agriculture and acquired considerable wealth. All the brothers were initiated into the Filiki Eteria during the pre-revolutionary years. When the Greek Revolution began, Konstantinos at the age of 18 years and his brother Paschalis enrolled in the Sacred Band. They fought together in the Battle of Dragatsani and the Battle of Skuleni. In the second battle, Paschalis was killed, while Konstantinos survived and lived in Bucharest into his old age.

After the independence of Greece, he honored the memory of the Sacred Band’s members by wearing their uniform every March 25 (the Greek Independence Day). He became a benefactor to Greece since he constructed a school in his birthplace and with a bequest founded the Xenokrateio Girls' School in Messolonghi. After his death, his house in Bucharest hosted the Xenokrateio Hospital.

The tunic of the Sacred Band’s uniform that belonged to Konstantinos Xenokratis, along with his guns, seal and traditional dress, were donated in 1899 by his family to the National Historical Museum of Greece. It is the only surviving example of the Sacred Band uniform.
