= Elisabeth Ypsilantis =

Greek aristocrat (1770–1866)

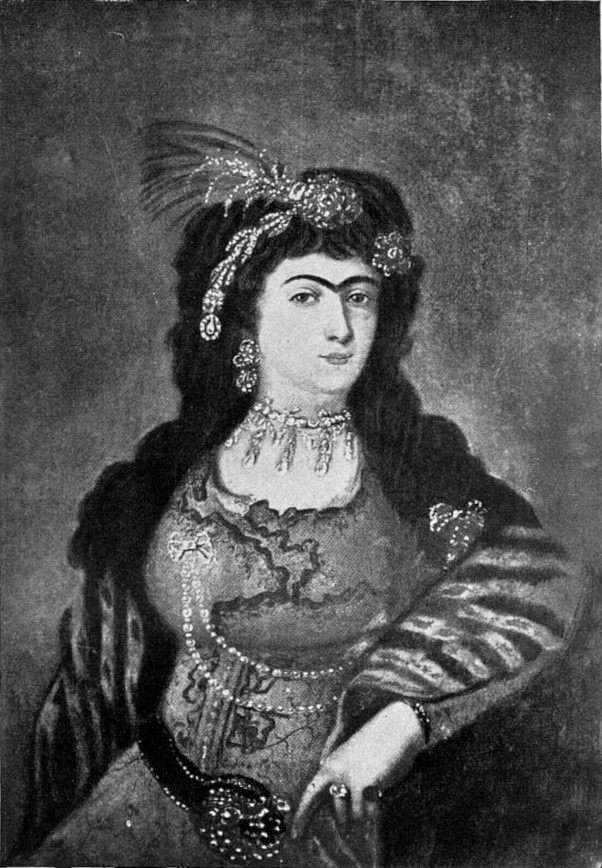
- Elisabeth Ypsilantis as Princess of Moldavia
- Born: Elisabeta Văcărescu; 1768; Iași, Moldavia
- Died: 2 October 1866 (aged 97–98); Odessa, Russian Empire
- Spouse: Constantine Ypsilantis
- Children: Aikaterini; Alexandros; Dimitrios; Nikolaos; Maria; Georgios; Grigorios
- Parents: Prince Constantin Văcărescu (father); Safta Kretzulescu (mother)
- Family: Văcărescu

Elisabeth Ypsilantis (Greek: Ελισάβετ Υψηλάντη, romanized: Elisavet Ypsilanti; 1768–1866), née Elisabeth Văcărescu (Romanian: Elisabeta Văcărescu; Greek: Ελισάβετ Βακαρέσκου), was a Greek aristocrat and an important figure during the period before the outbreak of the Greek War of Independence in 1821.

== Biography ==
Elisabeth Ypsilantis was born in 1768 in Iași, Moldavia. She was the daughter of Prince Constantin Văcărescu and Safta Kretzulescu. The great-granddaughter of Ianache Văcărescu, she came from the Văcărescu family, an important family of Moldavia originally from Northern Epirus.

She became a second wife of the ruler of Moldavia Constantine Ypsilantis. Together they had 7 children, the first of whom were the members of the Filiki Etaireia and protagonists of the Greek War of Independence, Alexandros, Dimitrios and Nikolaos:

- Aikaterini (1791–1835)
- Alexandros (1792–1828), leader of the Filiki Etaireia
- Dimitrios (1793–1832), member of the Filiki Etaireia
- Nikolaos (1796–1833), leader of the Sacred Band
- Maria (1798/1802–1846), wife of A. Schinas
- Georgios (1801–1829)
- Grigorios (1805–1835)

Elisabeth was called the "First Lady of the Filiki Etaireia", as during the years of preparation for the Greek War of Independence, she was the person who organized the preliminary meetings of personalities of the time in her salons, under the guise of literary meetings, which eventually led to the establishment of the Etaireia, of which she herself was probably one of the first female members.

It is said that in the house of this particular family, in the presence of Elisabeth, the Etaireia members gathered in February 1821 to decide on the start of the revolution and to prepare the relevant declaration.

After the death of her husband in 1816 and the confiscation of the property of the Ypsilantis family by the Sultan, Elisabeth was one of the main sponsors of the Greek Revolution, for which she offered the rest of her property. The result was that she fell into great poverty. Despite all the privations, however, she continued to support the vision of national liberation in every way.

She died in Odessa, on 2 October 1866.
