= Battle of Galați (1821) =

1821 battle

Battle of Drăgășani
- Part of the Greek War of Independence
Date	30 April – 1 May 1821
Location	Galați, Principality of Moldavia
Result	Ottoman victory

Belligerents
Greek Revolutionaries: Sacred Band	Ottoman Empire

Commanders and leaders
Athanasios Karpenisiotis	Yusuf Pasha Perkovtsalis

Strength
600 soldiers	5,000 soldiers (including 3,000 cavalry)

The Battle of Galați (in Greek: Μάχη του Γαλατσίου) was the first battle between the forces of the Filiki Eteria, led by Prince Alexander Ypsilantis, and the troops of the Ottoman Empire, as part of the wider Greek War of Independence. It took place on 1 May 1821 in Galați, in the Principality of Moldavia. The commander of the Greek forces, of Cretan origin, was Athanasios Karpenisiotis, while the Ottoman forces were led by Yusuf Pasha Perkovtsalis, Hacı Kara Ahmed Efendi, and Selim Mehmed Efendi.

== Background of the battle ==
Tsar Alexander I of Russia, under pressure from Klemens von Metternich, granted permission to the Sublime Porte to send Ottoman troops into the Danubian Principalities in order to suppress the revolutionaries. Command of the Ottoman army was assumed by the Wali of Silistra, Selim Mehmed, who in late April 1821 ordered the pasha of the fortress of Brăila, Yusuf Perkovtsalis, to recapture Galați.

Perkovtsalis set out with 2,000 infantrymen, 3,000 cavalrymen, and artillery. The defense of Galați was led by Thanasis Karpenisiotis, who organized a force of 600 fighters. He repaired the Russian bastions dating from the Russo-Turkish War (1806–1812) and installed 19 cannons sent by Greeks from Odessa and Bessarabia for Ypsilantis’ army. Leaving 400 men inside the city, he moved the remaining 200 and distributed them among three bastions.

On 30 April, the Ottoman vanguard crossed the Siret River, a tributary of the Danube, while 18 Ottoman barges armed with cannons sailed down the Danube to attack the Greeks from the river. Karpenisiotis held the central bastion. The other positions were held by the Manglieros brothers from Cephalonia, Giorgis Papas from Adrianople, Damianakos from Sfakia, and Father Petros Monik, who had left Izmail and, as recorded, "took up the cross and arms and came to partake in this sacred struggle for faith and fatherland".

At dawn on 1 May, the Ottomans launched their attack, placing the infantry in the center and supporting it on both flanks with cavalry. The Greeks repelled all assaults, but after four hours of fighting, the defenders of the right and left bastions broke and retreated, with the exception of Kottiras and his 32 fighters, who continued fighting without wasting “a single shot without enemy blood”. After exhausting their ammunition, they charged with their swords, broke through the Ottoman lines, and entered Galați, which had already been captured by the Ottomans. There, all of them were killed.

At the central bastion, Karpenisiotis, together with 45 fighters, continued fighting, repelling thousands of Ottomans with cannon and musket fire. The Ottomans reportedly left 700 dead at this position. When night fell, the battle came to an end.

For the few surviving fighters, there was no longer any hope of salvation. At dawn, they threw their cloaks outward, into which the Ottomans fired their muskets. Before the Ottomans could reload, the Greeks launched a sudden assault and broke through the encirclement. Twenty fighters, including Karpenisiotis, managed to escape alive. As Xodilos wrote: "This battle of 1 May in Galați, although it appears damaging to the Greeks, was nevertheless sufficiently glorious for them and a clear portent of the Greeks’ victory over the Turks."

The Ottomans destroyed Galați almost completely and massacred its population, as reprisals.
