= Battle of Sculeni =

Battle of the Greek War of Independence

- Part of the Wallachian Uprising of the Greek War of Independence
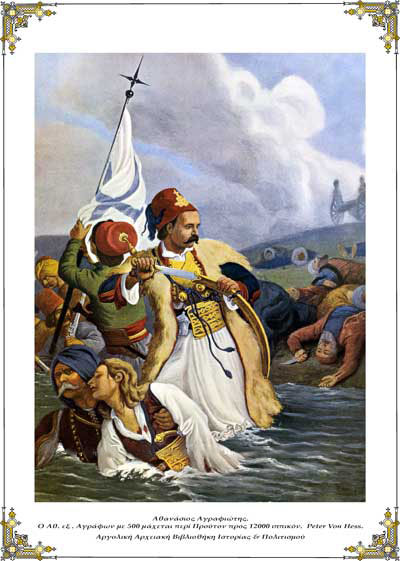
- Athanasios Agrafiotis fights in Pruth by Peter von Hess
Date	29 June 1821
Location	Sculeni, Principality of Moldavia, Ottoman Empire 47°19′N 27°38′E
Result	Ottoman victory

Belligerents
Greek revolutionaries	Ottoman Empire

Commanders and leaders
George Kantakouzenos; Giorgakis Olympios; Yiannis Pharmakis; Athanasios Agrafiotis	Unknown

Strength
400–500	5,000

Casualties and losses
375	Unknown

The Battle of Sculeni was fought on 29 June 1821 in Sculeni, Moldavia between Ottoman forces and the Greek revolutionary forces raised by the Filiki Eteria led by Prince George Katakouzenos. The battle came about as the result of Ottoman reprisals for Alexander Ypsilantis' expedition in the two Danubian Principalities, and followed in the aftermath of the Battle of Drăgășani. When the Ottomans crossed the Bahlui River in Iaşi on 25 June 1821, Lieutenant Catakouzenos and his forces, originally stationed on the Russian frontier, crossed the Prut River.

== Battle ==
The Ottomans possessed a military that outnumbered the Greeks at approximately ten to one. Catacouzenos imitated the retreat of Ypsilantis to the Austrian Empire after Drăgășani, by fleeing to Russia. However, his forces, made up of around 500 young Greek soldiers (Edwin Emerson places the number at 400 soldiers), wanted to stay and fight against the Ottoman Empire. During the battle, approximately one-fourth of the Greek army fled by swimming across the Prut. The remaining soldiers continued to fight until they were either killed by the Ottomans or drowned in the river. Giorgakis Olympios, a military leader who commanded an army in Wallachia, was garrisoned in the Moldavian Secu Monastery; Giorgakis fought until the Ottomans stormed the monastery and forced him to light powder kegs from which he perished in the explosion. However, Giorgakis had a Macedonian comrade by the name of Yiannis Pharmakis, who continued the fight for a fortnight longer. In the end, on 4 October 1821, Pharmakis surrendered on the promise that his life would be spared. The promise was not kept by the Ottomans, and Pharmakis was ultimately decapitated in Constantinople.

== Aftermath ==
After the battle, all Greek uprisings in the Danubian Principalities and other northern areas subject to the Ottoman Empire ceased. However, the primary task, which was to divert significant Ottoman military forces at all costs towards the Northern Balkans, that would otherwise be used to fight and crush the Greek War of Independence in the South, was accomplished.

== General references ==
- Ghervas, Stella (2008). Réinventer la tradition. Alexandre Stourdza et l'Europe de la Sainte-Alliance [Reinvent the tradition. Alexandre Stourdza and the Europe of the Holy Alliance] (in French). Paris: Honoré Champion. ISBN 978-2-7453-1669-1.
