= Battle of Drăgășani =

Battle of the Greek War of Independence

- Part of the Wallachian uprising of the Greek War of Independence
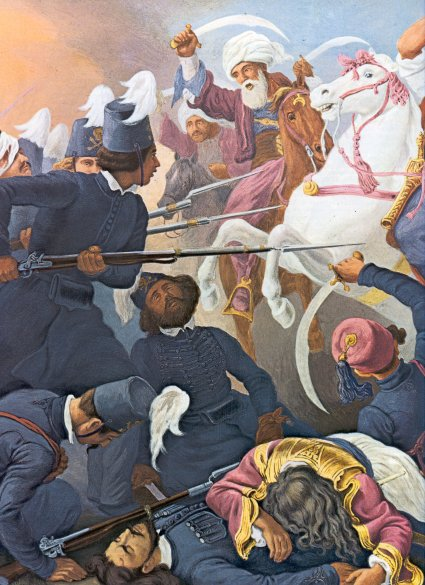
- The Sacred Band fights in Dragatsani by Peter von Hess (Benaki Museum, Athens)
Date	19 June 1821
Location	Drăgăşani, Principality of Wallachia, Ottoman Empire 44.6611°N 24.2606°E
Result	Ottoman victory

Belligerents
Greek Revolutionaries: Sacred Band	Ottoman Empire

Commanders and leaders
Alexandros Ypsilantis; Nikolaos Ypsilantis; Giorgakis Olympios; Athanasios Tsakalov; Nikolaos Ypsilantis; Vasileios Karavias	Kara Ahmed

Strength
500 infantry 500 cavalry	2,000 cavalry

Casualties and losses
400+ dead	Unknown

The Battle of Drăgășani (or Dragashani) was fought on 19 June 1821 in Drăgășani, Wallachia, between the Ottoman forces of Sultan Mahmud II and the Greek Filiki Etaireia insurgents as a part of the Greek War of Independence.

== Context ==
Alexander Ypsilantis and the Etaireia had carried out an invasion of the Ottoman-dominated Danubian Principalities which coincided with an uprising in Wallachia. Ypsilantis, a general in the Russian Army and aide-de-camp to Tsar Alexander I, had hoped that his actions would cause the Russian Empire to intervene on behalf of the Greek insurgents, but the Emperor, a leading proponent of the Concert of Europe, disavowed any relation with him and effectively gave the Ottomans the "green light" to march into the Principalities to deal with the insurrection. At the same time, Ypsilantis clashed with the Wallachian Pandur leader Tudor Vladimirescu, who was ultimately tortured and killed by the Etaireia, causing the Wallachian rebel troops to withdraw from the conflict.

== Battle ==
An army of two thousand Ottoman cavalry camped, under the leadership of Kara Ahmed, at Drăgășani, in order to repulse the forces of Ypsilantis. The latter, after a council with his co-leaders (Giorgakis Olympios, Nikolaos Ypsilantis, Vasileios Karavias), decided to attack Drăgășani with his full army, which was consisted to be 7,500 troops and four cannons.

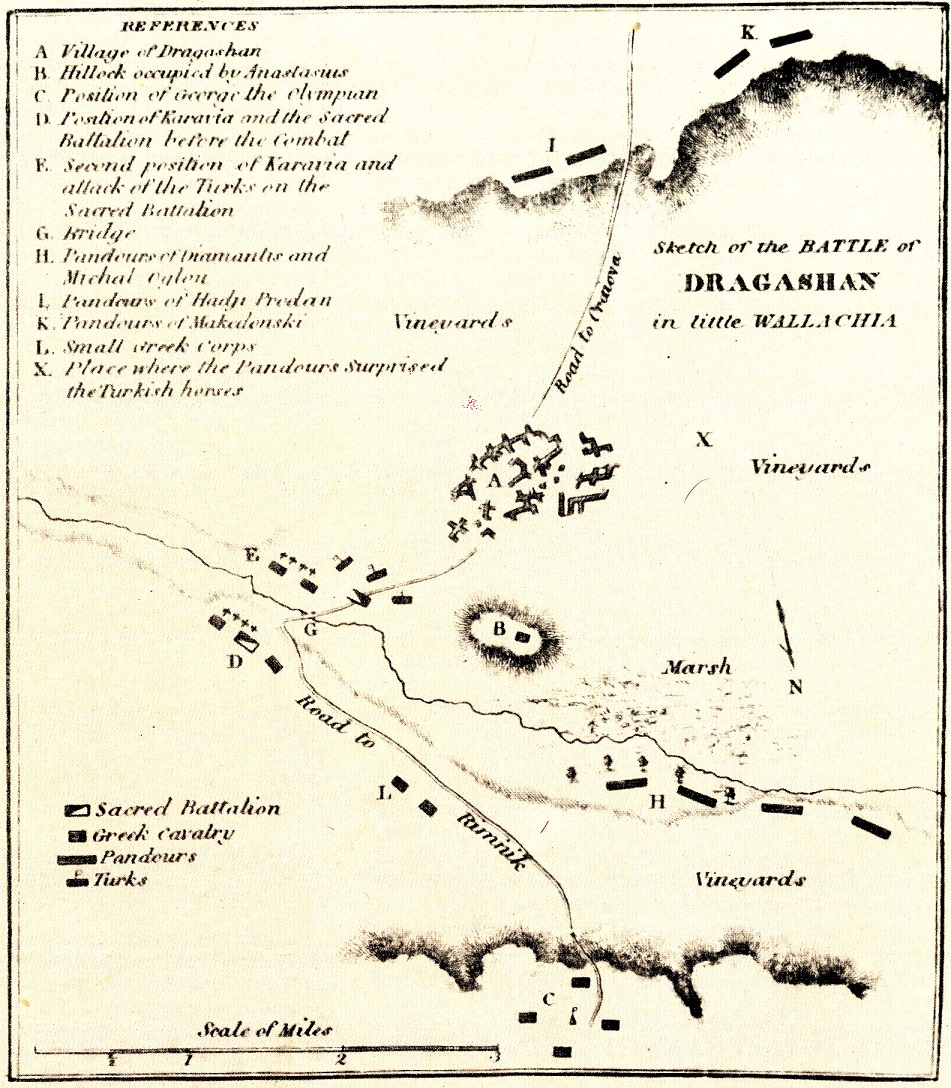
Battle of Drăgășani from Thomas Gordon's book on the Greek Revolution (1832)

At 19 June 1821, Vasileios Karavias noticed the Ottomans retreating from Drăgășani and commanded his men to attack. The rest of the army, however, was not ready and Karavias acted alone with only 500 horsemen and the "Sacred Band" (a volunteer unit mostly made up of 500 young Greek students from both upper and middle classes led by Nikolaos Ypsilantis and Athanasios Tsakalov).

The Ottomans, noticing that the size of the attacking force was less than a half of theirs, returned to their positions and conflicted with the Greeks. Soon the Ottoman greater numbers outweighed the surprising attack of Karavias. The latter retreated, but the Sacred Band did not. The Sacred Band stood and fought the four times larger Ottoman cavalry, even though every hope of victory was lost. Giorgakis Olympios with some men attacked and distracted the Ottomans for a while, saving about a hundred men with their leaders. After this conflict the Wallachian uprising started slowly fall apart.

== Aftermath ==
Despite its failure, the revolution in the Danubian Principalities helped inspire the uprisings in the Peloponnese. Another aspect of the battle's aftermath entailed Alexander Ypsilantis' retreat to the Austrian-ruled area of Transylvania, after having written a forged letter to his troops stating that he was summoned by Francis I, the Emperor of Austria, to discuss military operations against the Ottomans on the Austrian frontier.
