= Giorgakis Olympios =

Greek military commander (1772–1821)

- Γιωργάκης Ολύμπιος; Iordache Olimpiotul
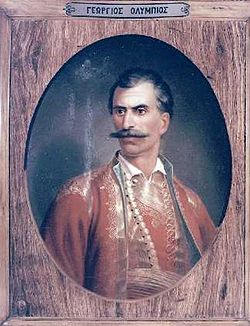
- A portrait of Giorgakis Olympios; National Historical Museum of Athens
- Born: 1772; Livadi, Sanjak of Eğriboz, Ottoman Empire (now Greece)
- Died: 1821 (aged 48–49); Neamț, Danubian Principalities, Ottoman Empire (now Romania)
- Military career
- Allegiance: Serbian revolutionaries Filiki Etaireia
- Conflicts: First Serbian Uprising; Greek War of Independence: Wallachian uprising of 1821; Battle of Sculeni †

Giorgakis Olympios (Greek: Γιωργάκης Ολύμπιος; Romanian: Iordache Olimpiotul; Serbian: Капетан Јоргаћ; 1772–1821) was an armatole and military commander during the Greek War of Independence against the Ottoman Empire. Noted for his activities with the Filiki Eteria in the Danubian Principalities, he is considered to be a leading figure of the Greek Revolution.

== Biography ==
=== Early activities ===
Olympios was an ethnic Aromanian. He was born in the village of Livadi, near Larissa, on Mount Olympus, in Ottoman-ruled Greece. After joining the Armatolikia in the Olympus area around the age of 20, Olympios became a prominent member of the local society by protecting villages from the Ali Pasha's raids, when the powerful Pasha started expanding his authority out of Epirus. In 1798, however, he was forced to abandon his birthplace, due to Ali Pasha's hostility towards him, and fled to Serbia, where he collaborated for some time with Karađorđe Petrović during the First Serbian Uprising (he is known in Serbia as Kapetan Jorgać, Captain Giorgakis).

Olympios became a supporter of the ideas diffused by Rigas Feraios for a common Balkan revolution against the Ottoman rule, and moved to Wallachia. There, with the help of Constantine Ypsilantis, he composed a military force of Greeks to fight alongside the Russian Empire in the Russo-Turkish War of 1806. After the Battle of Ostrova, he was named a Polkovnik in the Russian Army. For his military service, Emperor Alexander I awarded him the Order of Saint Anna. Alexander I also included him in the Russian military escort during the Congress of Vienna, where Olympios met with Alexander Ypsilantis, a Filiki Eteria leader.

=== Greek War of Independence ===
Olympios entered Filiki Eteria in 1817, taking the high rank of Shepherd. He initiated many others in the Eteria, and established contacts with the Wallachian Pandur Tudor Vladimirescu, who led the parallel uprising of 1821. Olympios married Čučuk Stana, the widow of Hajduk Veljko, who had arrived from Serbia to participate in the Greek War of Independence as a fighter, alongside his own men. They had three children: sons Milanos and Alexandros and daughter Euphrosyne.

At the beginning of the Greek War of Independence, when the Eteria began its expedition in Moldavia and Wallachia, Olympios was appointed leader of the Greek forces in Bucharest by Alexander Ypsilantis, at first cooperating with Tudor Vladimirescu, who led the parallel Wallachian uprising. However, when Vladimirescu distanced himself from the Filiki Eteria, Olympios was responsible for his arrest on 1 June in Goleşti - following which Vladimirescu was summarily put to death .

He took part in the Battle of Sculeni on 29 June 1821, when Ottoman forces chased him (along with Yiannis Pharmakis and a small force of 400 Greeks) to the Secu Monastery in the Neamț County, where the Greeks made their last stand. Olympios died during the Ottoman attack to the monastery, when he blew up the gunpowder storage to not surrender himself.

His widow and children fled to Khotyn, then part of the Bessarabia Governorate of the Russian Empire, where other people of the Serbian and Greek War, had taken refuge.

After the liberation of Greece, Stana and her children moved to Athens.

== Legacy ==
Following the dissolution of the Aromanian collaborationist Roman Legion during the Axis occupation of Greece, the National Liberation Front (EAM) of the Greek resistance sponsored the establishment of an Aromanian armed band, in theory separate from the EAM, named after Olympios to draw Aromanians into the resistance effort against the Axis occupation.

== See also ==
- Hadži-Prodan Gligorijević, fellow Serbian revolutionary that participated in the same wars
- Vasos Mavrovouniotis, fellow Montenegrin Serb revolutionary that participated in the Greek War
