= Alexander Ypsilantis =

Greek revolutionary and commander (1792–1828)

Major General Alexandros Ypsilantis
- Αλέξανδρος Υψηλάντης (Greek); Alexandru Ipsilanti (Romanian); Александр Константинович Ипсиланти (Russian)
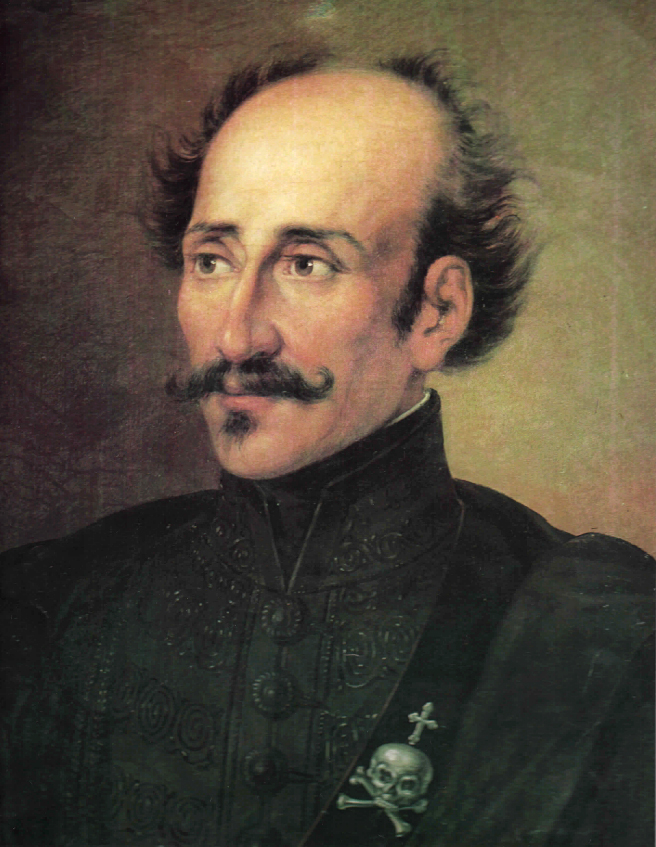
- Ypsilantis in Sacred Band's attire National Historical Museum of Greece.
- Born: 12 December 1792; Constantinople, Ottoman Empire (now Istanbul, Turkey)
- Died: 31 January 1828 (aged 35); Vienna, Austrian Empire
- Burial place: Taxiarches Church, Pedion tou Areos
- Relatives: Alexandros Ypsilantis (grandfather); Konstantinos Ypsilantis (father); Demetrios Ypsilantis (brother)
- Military career
- Allegiance: Russian Empire; First Hellenic Republic
- Branch: Imperial Russian Army Filiki Etaireia; Greek Revolutionary Army: Sacred Band
- Service years: 1805–1821
- Rank: Major General (Imperial Russian Army)
- Units: Grodno Hussar Regiment
- Commands: Commander of the 1st Brigade of Hussars (1st Hussar Division); Leader of the Filiki Etaireia; Leader of the Sacred Band
- Conflicts: Napoleonic Wars; French invasion of Russia; Battle of Klyastitsy; First Battle of Polotsk; War of the Sixth Coalition; Battle of Bautzen; Battle of Dresden (WIA); Greek War of Independence; Wallachian Uprising; Battle of Dragashani
- Other work: Aide-de-camp of Tsar Alexander I

Alexandros Ypsilantis (Note: Greek: Αλέξανδρος Υψηλάντης, romanized: Aléxandros Ypsilántis, pronounced [aˈleksanðros ipsiˈla(n)dis]; Romanian: Alexandru Ipsilanti; Russian: Александр Константинович Ипсиланти, romanized: Aleksandr Konstantinovich Ipsilanti) (12 December 1792 – 31 January 1828) was a Greek nationalist politician who was member of a prominent Phanariot Greek family, a prince of the Danubian Principalities, a senior officer of the Imperial Russian cavalry during the Napoleonic Wars, and a leader of the Filiki Etaireia, a secret organization that coordinated the beginning of the Greek War of Independence against the Ottoman Empire.

== Early life ==
The Ypsilantis family hailed from the Pontic Greek population of Trabzon. He was born on 12 December 1792 in Constantinople, the capital of the Ottoman Empire, as the eldest of five brothers (the others being Demetrios, Nicholas, Georgios and Grigorios). His father Constantine Ypsilantis and grandfather Alexander were active in the Ottoman administration and highly educated, each with their own share of service as a dragoman in the Sultan's court and as hospodars of the Danubian Principalities. His mother, Elisabeta Văcărescu was member of the Văcărescu family of Wallachia.

== Russian military service ==
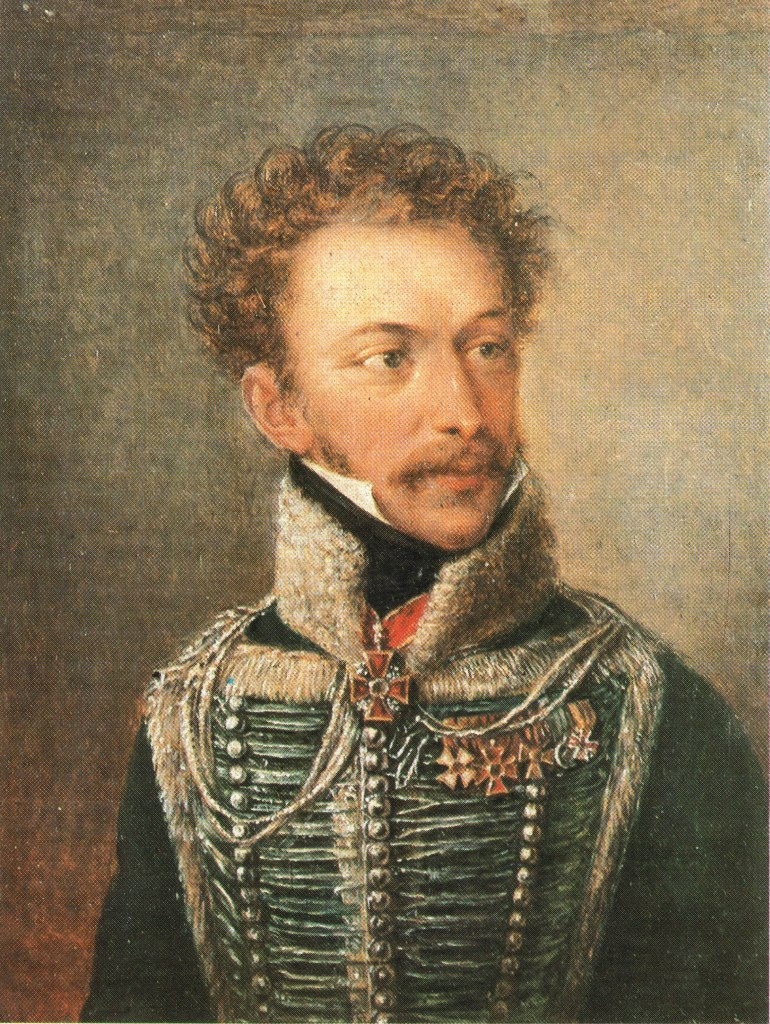
Ypsilantis in the uniform of a senior officer of the Russian Hussars, 1810s.

With the outbreak of the Russo-Turkish War in 1805, his father fled with family to Imperial Russia. The young Alexander had received a thorough education, becoming fluent in Russian, French, German and Romanian. At the age of 15, he was presented to the Russian Court, where he came under the patronage of Empress Maria Feodorovna.

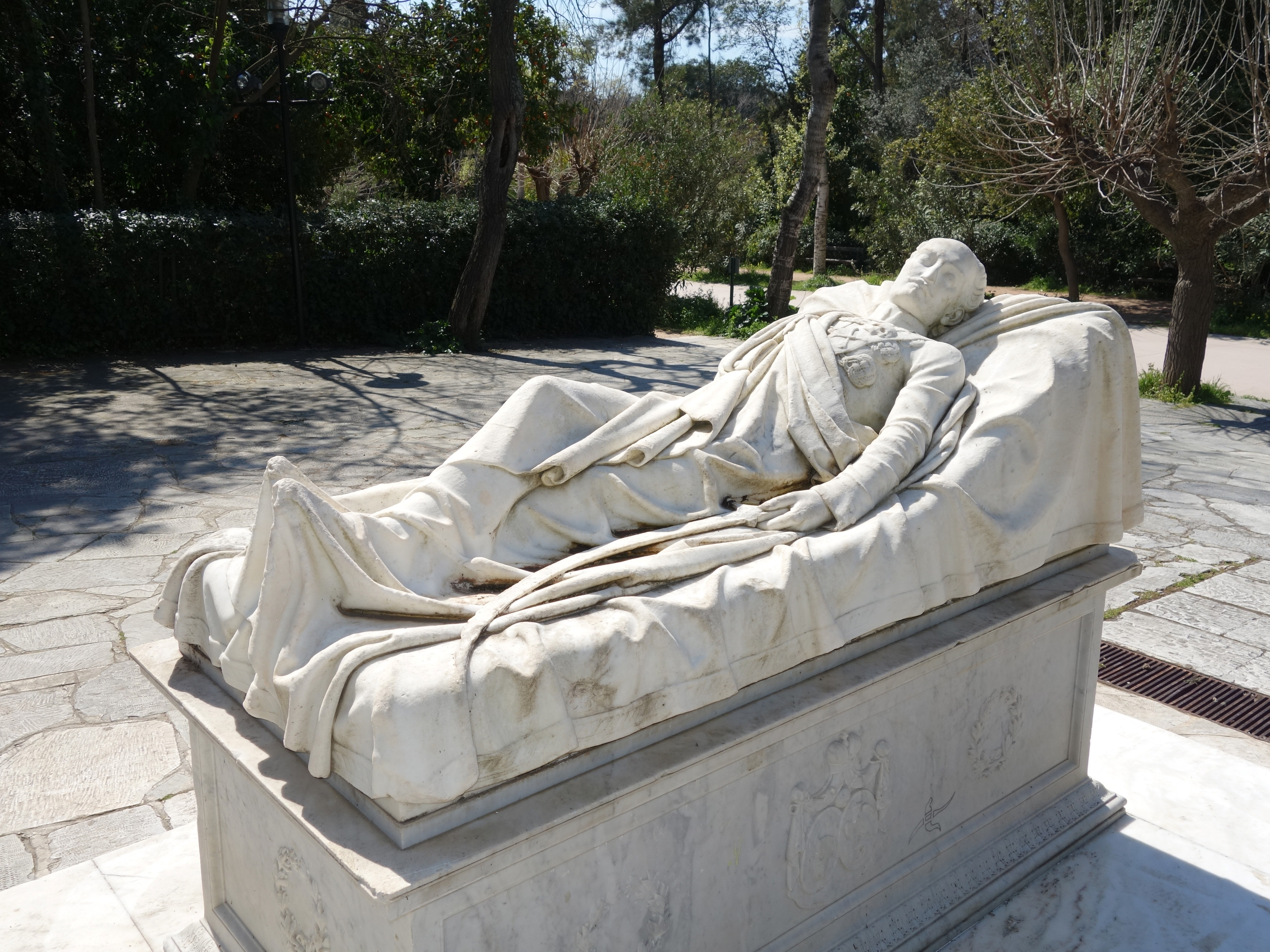
Monument of Alexandros Ypsilantis, that contains his bones, by Leonidas Drosis, Pedion tou Areos, Athens, 1869

On 12 April 1808, he entered a commission in the prestigious Chevalier Guard Regiment with the rank of cornet. Moving rapidly up the ranks, he was promoted to lieutenant on 27 September 1810 and to Stabs-Rittmeister on 18 October of the same year. During the French invasion of Russia, he fought in the battles of Klyastitsy and Polotsk. Promoted to full Rittmeister (captain) on 20 February 1813, he went on to participate in the Battle of Bautzen. On 6 July, he was transferred to the Grodno Hussar Regiment as lieutenant colonel, and participated with his new unit in the Battle of Dresden, where his right arm was torn off by a shell.

Although he was immediately promoted to full colonel, it meant that Ypsilantis would not be able to see action again. However, he attended the Congress of Vienna, where he was a popular figure in society (see Auguste Louis Charles La Garde de Chambonas, Souvenirs), and earned the sympathy of Tsar Alexander I, who appointed him his aide-de-camp on 1 January 1816. In late 1817, at the age of 25, he became a major general and commander of the 1st Brigade of Hussars of the 1st Hussar Division.

== Preparations for the Greek insurrection ==
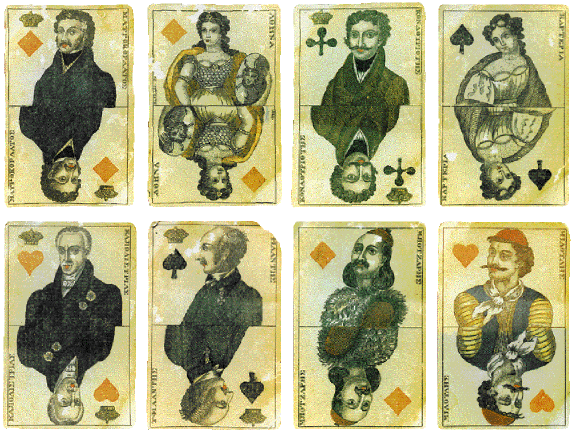
Playing cards from 1829 depicting heroes of the Greek War of Independence with Ypsilantis as the King of Spades. Historical and Ethnological Museum of Athens.

In 1820, on the refusal of Count Ioannis Kapodistrias, the Russian foreign minister, to accept the post of leader of the Filiki Eteria, the post was offered to Ypsilantis, who was then elected as the leader of the secret society. Following that, he processed and approved the general plan of the Greek war of Independence, which was revised during May 1820 at Bucharest, with the participation of rebel captains from mainland Greece.

The main points of the plan were:

- to aid the simultaneous revolt of Serbs and Montenegrins.
- to provoke a revolt in Wallachia, by also enlisting rebels from the Serbian lands, battle-hardened from the first and second Serbian uprisings.
- to provoke civil unrest in Constantinople through the use of agents and to burn the Ottoman fleet at the city's port.
- to start the revolution in Greece in the Peloponnese, after Ypsilantis's arrival there.

Ypsilantis issued a declaration on 8 October 1820, announcing that he would soon be starting a revolt against the Ottoman Empire. Ypsilantis began his declaration by praising ancient Greece, writing: "Cast your eyes toward the seas, which are covered by our seafaring cousins, ready to follow the example of Salamis. Look to the land, and everywhere you will see Leonidas at the head of the patriotic Spartans". Ypsilantis went on to say that the Greeks did not need foreign help as they could defeat the Turks on their own before going on to say that Russian support was assured.

== Campaign in Moldavia and Wallachia ==
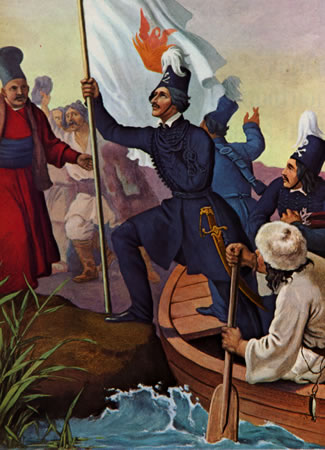
Alexandros Ypsilantis crosses the Pruth by Peter von Hess, Benaki Museum, Athens.

Because information regarding the existence and the activities of the Filiki Eteria had leaked to the Ottoman authorities, Ypsilantis hastened the outbreak of the revolt in Wallachia and participated personally in it. Beginning the revolution in the Danubian Principalities had the added benefit that they, being autonomous under the joint suzerainty of Russia and the Ottoman Empire, did not have Ottoman garrisons and, similarly, the local leaders were entitled to maintain small armed retinues for their own protection. Legally, the Ottomans could not move their forces into Wallachia or Moldavia without Russia's permission, and if the Ottomans sent their forces in unilaterally, Russia might go to war. The Prince of Moldavia, Michael Soutsos was a Phanariot Greek who was secretly a member of the Philiki Eteria, but at the same time however, Soutsos was an opportunist who hedged his bets by secretly informing the Sublime Porte of the planned invasion. Therefore, on 22 February 1821 (O.S.), accompanied by several other Greek officers in Russian service, Ypsilantis crossed the Prut river at Sculeni into the Principalities. Two days later, at Iaşi he issued a proclamation, announcing that he had "the support of a great power" (meaning Russia).

Ypsilantis hoped that a revolt would ultimately lead to a Russian intervention: since the Ottomans would have to invade and quell the rebellion, the Orthodox Russians would certainly intervene in favour of their fellow Orthodox. In this hope he was justified, since eventually, the Greek rebellion led to the Russo-Turkish War of 1828 in which Russian troops marched to the outskirts of Constantinople and forced the Sultan to recognize the autonomy of the new Greek state. In 1821 however, Tsar Alexander was still a committed member of the Holy Alliance, and acted swiftly to disassociate himself from Ypsilantis: Count Capodistria denounced Ypsilantis for having misused the Tsar's trust, stripped him of his rank and commanded him to lay down arms. Soon after, Capodistria himself had to take an "indefinite leave of absence" from his post.

These moves emboldened the Turks, who began assembling a large number of troops to quell the insurrection in Wallachia. Ypsilantis marched from Iaşi to Bucharest, trying to enlist volunteers. Ypsilantis was constantly short of money and his men turned to plundering the region. At Galați, one of Ypsilantis's officers, Vasilios Karavias murdered the local Turkish merchants to raise funds while in Iași the local Ottoman guard of 50 men were killed after surrendering and receiving promises that their lives would be spared. It was then that the Sacred Band was formed, comprising young Greek volunteers from all over Europe. Ypsilantis advanced slowly, not entering Wallachia until early April, by which time Tudor Vladimirescu had seized Bucharest. A further problem arose when the Patriarch Grigorios placed an anathema on Ypsilantis as an enemy of the Orthodox faith, called on true believers to remain loyal to the Sultan, and denounced Ypsilantis for "a foul, impious and foolish work".

In Bucharest, where he had arrived after some weeks' delay, it became plain that he could not rely on the Wallachian Pandurs to continue their Oltenian-based revolt for assistance to the Greek cause; Ypsilantis was met with mistrust by the Pandur leader Tudor Vladimirescu, who, as a nominal ally to the Eteria, had started the rebellion as a move to prevent Scarlat Callimachi from reaching the throne in Bucharest, while trying to maintain relations with both Russia and the Ottomans. More fundamentally, Ypsilantis and other Greek leaders relied on the support of the Romanians, on the base of their common Christian Orthodox faith, and underestimated the increasing resentment of Greek influence in the Principalities during the Phanariote era and the first stirrings of what would become Romanian nationalism.

Further, Vladimirescu regarded the Russian renunciation of Ypsilantis as absolving him from any further commitment to the Filiki Eteria. As a result, a conflict erupted inside Vladimirescu's camp. In the end, Vladimirescu was summarily tried and put to death by the pro-Greek faction and by the Eteria.

Flag of Ypsilanti's Sacred Band

In the meantime, the Ottomans crossed the Danube river with 30,000 tactical troops and Ypsilantis, instead of advancing on Brăila, where he arguably could have prevented the Ottoman armies from entering the Principalities and might have forced Russia to accept a fait accompli, retreated and organized his defense at a semi-mountainous area close to Iaşi. There followed a series of major battles that led to the defeat of the Eteria's forces, culminating in the final defeat at Drăgăşani on 7 June. After a long march in the rain, Ypsilantis's army was exhausted, but Karavias, who was drunk, led the Sacred Band into a charge against the Ottomans. As the inexperienced and ill-trained men of the Sacred Band did not form squares, which would have allowed them to pack enough firepower together, the Ottoman cavalry had no difficulty in cutting down the rebels.

After the defeat, Ypsilantis fled north. In his final statement to his men, he refused responsibility for the defeat and blamed his men, writing:

Soldiers! No! I will no longer pollute that sacred and honourable name by applying it to you. You are a cowardly rabble!...You have broken your oaths, you have betrayed God and your country, you have betrayed me too at the moment when I hoped either to conquer or to die with honor among you... Run off to the Turks, who alone are worthy of your support...run off to the Turks, and kiss their hands from which still drips the blood of those they have inhumanely slaughtered. Yes! Run off to them, buy slavery with your lives and with the honor of your wives and children!

Ypsilantis's army booed him when he read out this declaration.

== Refuge ==
Ypsilantis, accompanied by what remained of his followers, retreated to Râmnic, where he spent some days in negotiating with the Austrian authorities for permission to cross the frontier. Fearing that his defeated followers might surrender him to the Turks, he gave out that Austria had declared war on Turkey, caused a Te Deum to be sung in the church of Cozia, and, on pretext of arranging measures with the Austrian commander-in-chief, crossed the frontier. But the reactionary policies of the Holy Alliance were enforced by Francis I and Klemens Metternich, and the country refused to give asylum for leaders of revolts in neighboring countries. Ypsilantis was kept in close confinement for seven years (1823 to 1827 in Terezín), until he was released at the insistence of the emperor Nicholas I of Russia.

== Death ==
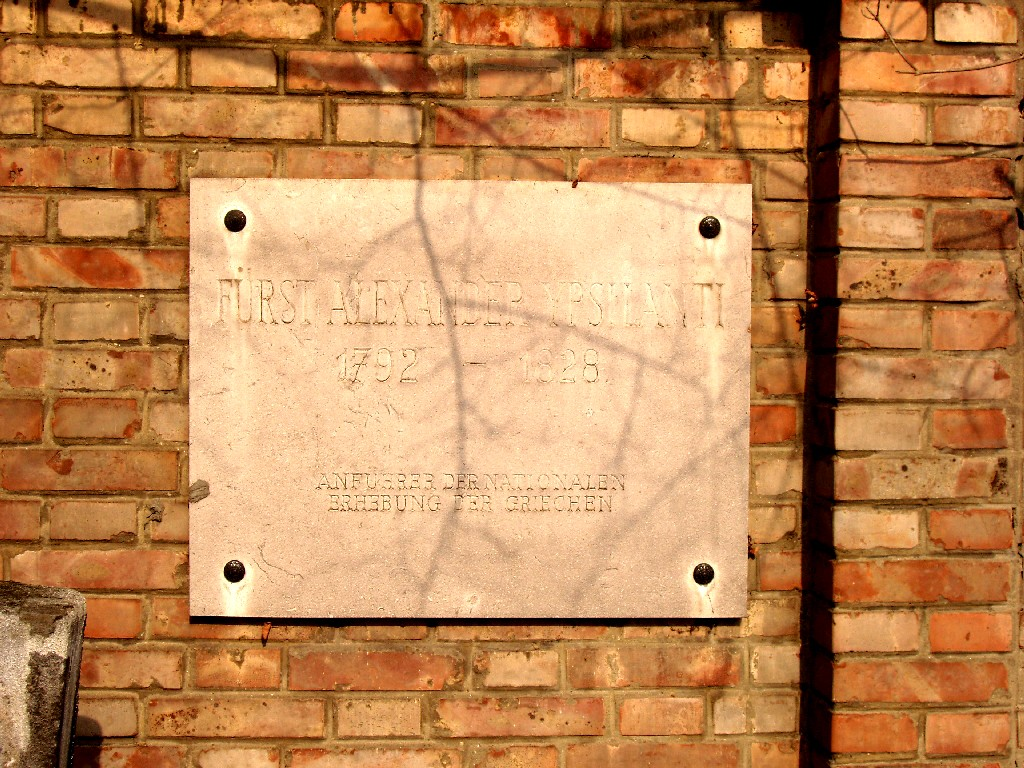
Commemorative plate at St. Marx Cemetery in Vienna

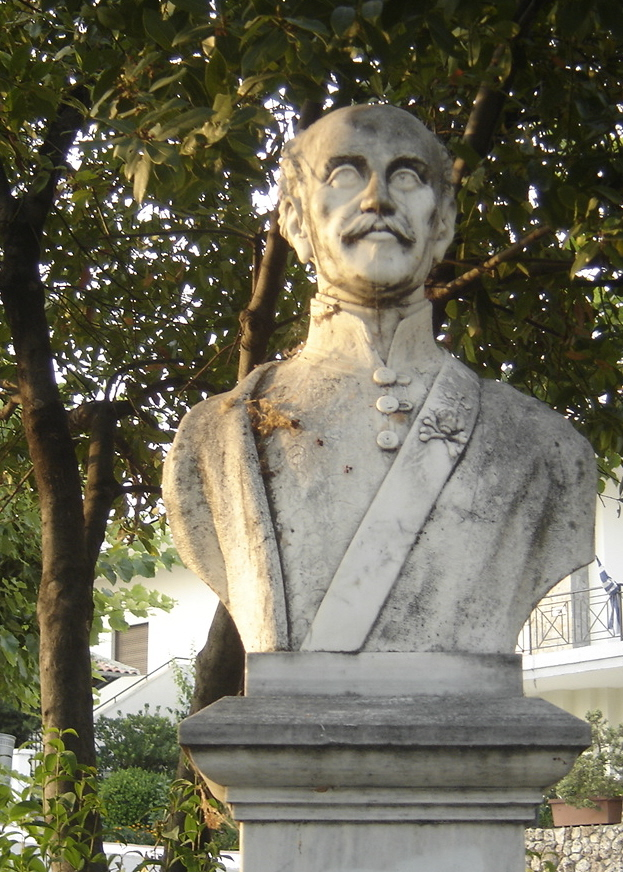
A bust of Alexandros Ypsilantis in Nea Trapezounta, Pieria

After his release, he retired to Vienna, where he died in extreme poverty and misery on 29 January 1828. His last wish that his heart be removed from his body and sent to Greece was fulfilled by Georgios Lassanis, and it is now located at the Holy Church of the All-Great Taxiarchs of the Amalieion Orphanage, a chapel close to the National Garden in Athens. His appearance in likenesses and the accounts of his life suggest he had dystrophia myotonica, a congenital multi-system disorder.

His body was originally buried in St. Marx cemetery. Much later, on 18 February 1903, his remains were transferred by members of his family to the Ypsilanti-Sina estate, Schloss Rappoltenkirchen, Sieghartskirchen, Austria. His last transfer occurred in August 1964, when he was relocated to the [Holy Church of the All-Great Taxiarchs] in Pedion tou Areos, a city park in Athens, Greece, 136 years after his death.

== Cultural references ==
Alexander Ypsilantis is mentioned in Russian literature by Alexander Pushkin in his short story "The Shot". The hero of Pushkin's story, Silvio, dies in a campaign under command of Ypsilantis. He, and his failed campaign, is also mentioned by Pushkin in the short story Kirdjali.

== See also ==
- Alexander Ypsilantis (1725–1805) – grandfather
- Constantine Ypsilantis – father
- Demetrios Ypsilantis – brother

== Notes ==
Preceded by Veniamin Costache	Military ruler of Moldavia; 1821	Succeeded by Ştefan Vogoride
