= Pedion tou Areos =

Pedion tou Areos Πεδίον του Άρεως
- Neighborhood
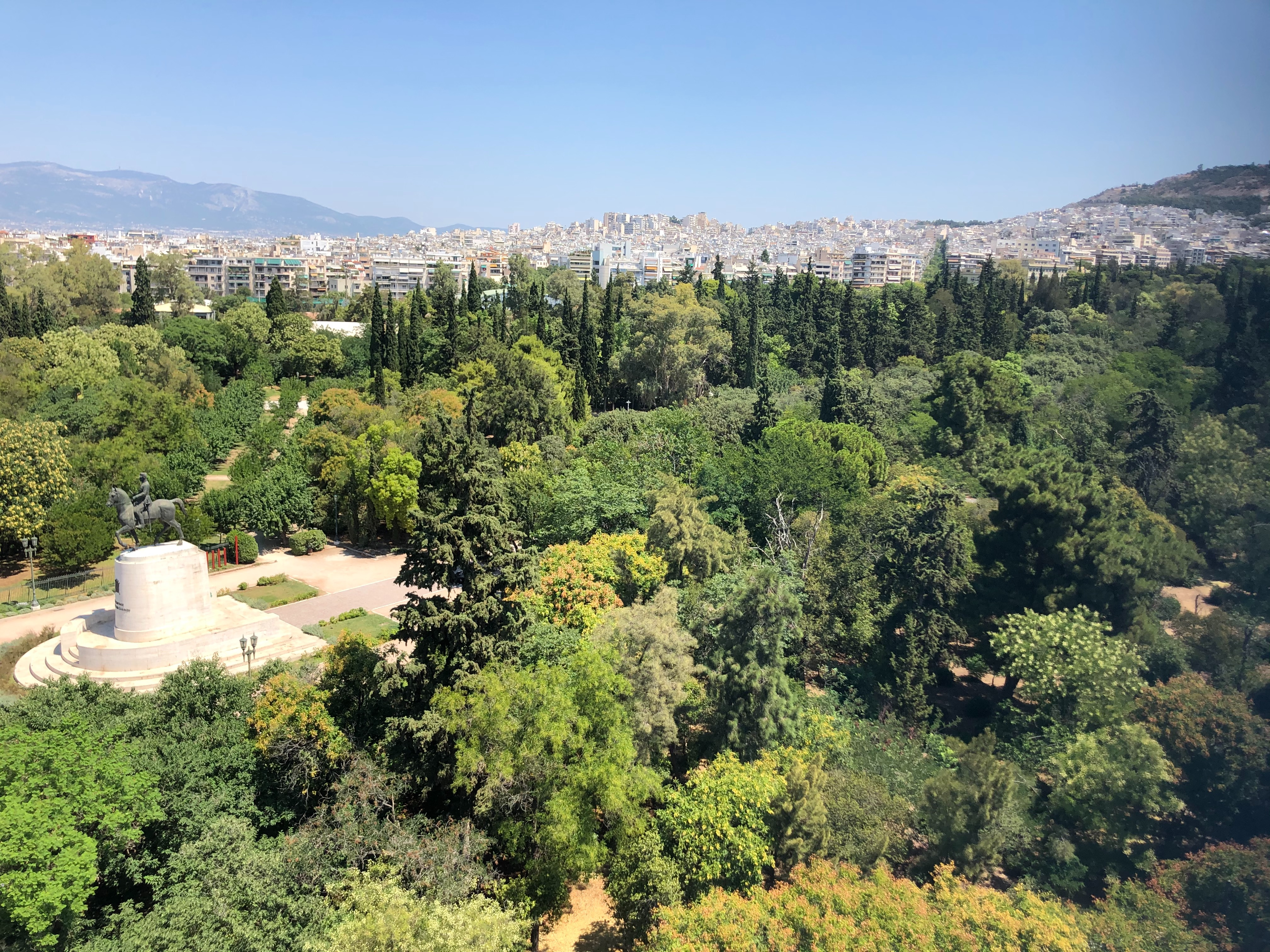
- Panoramic view

- Location within Athens
- Country: Greece
- Region: Attica
- City: Athens
- Postal code: 104 34, 114 74
- Area code: 210
- Website: www.cityofathens.gr

The Pedion tou Areos or Pedion Areos (Greek: Πεδίον του Άρεως or Πεδίον Άρεως, pronounced [peˈðion tu ˈareos], meaning Field of Ares, corresponding to the French Champ de Mars and the ancient Campus Martius) is one of the largest public parks in Athens, Greece.

It is also the name of the wider neighborhood.

== Park ==
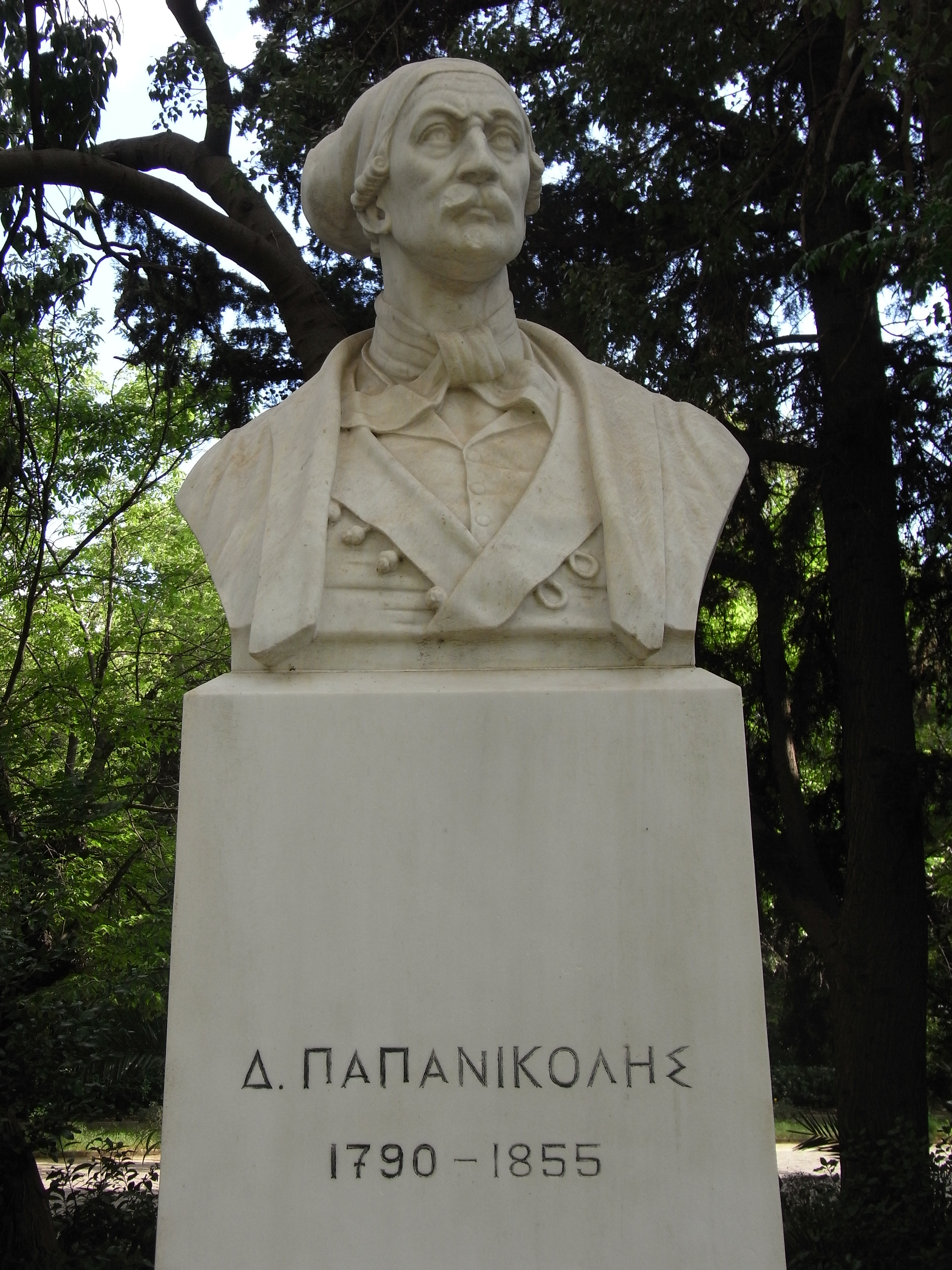
Bust of Dimitrios Papanikolis

The park was designed in 1934 and its purpose was to honor the heroes of the Greek Revolution of 1821, 21 of whom are depicted in marble busts standing in the park. The initial plan included the construction of a "Pantheon" for the revolutionaries and also a major Christian temple, dedicated to Greek independence.

The park is a state-owned public ground, covering an area of 27.7 hectares, and is located about 1 km NE from the Omonoia Square. Today, it is enclosed by the streets Mavromateon, Evelpidon, Pringiponisson and the Alexandras Avenue. In front of the main entrance of the park there has been an equestrian statue of king Constantine I since 1938. At the other entrance, near Alexandras Avenue, stands a memorial to the English, Australian and New Zealander soldiers who fought in the Battle of Greece in the Second World War. The memorial is surmounted by a statue of goddess Athena. A total renovation of the park was completed in December 2010.

These premises were the primary meeting spot for Athenians during the time of the first king of modern Greece, Otto. In 1927 the area was given to the newly created Commission for Public Gardens and Trees of Athens to transform it into a park like the National Garden.

The commission, however, decided first to improve Thiseion and the National Garden and six years later, in 1933, the works to reform the park began, financed by the restricted funds that were left. The works stopped due to severe administrative problems, as well as severe lack of funds. The then-new governmental institution Special Funds for Permanent Pavements of Athens decided (law 6171/1934) to undertake the costs. A. Dimitrakopoulos, director of the Ministry of Communications, was appointed to prepare a general plan for the park and did so based on the styles of English and French parks popular at that time. N. Vosiniotis was appointed to implement the new plans. Special care was taken not to impede the view of the Acropolis from any central points in the park; however, no limit on the height of the surrounding buildings was enforced.

The work of planting and upgrading began in 1935 and continued through the Metaxas Regime until 1940, when Greece entered World War II. During those five years, 46000 trees and bushes were planted. Continuing the plan, deciduous trees were planted to afford the park shade in the summer and sunlight during the winter.

In the central square of the park there is a fountain surrounded by many plants that thrive in the Mediterranean climate and create beautiful natural colour combinations, corresponding to each season. After the end of the war, in October 1944, irrigation was provided for the park.

The Hellenic Military Geographical Service and the sport camp of Panellinios G.S. can be found at the SW part of the park, in the direction of Kipseli. Inside the park there are also two churches, a playground and the open theater ‘Aliki’ that is used for plays, events and concerts. One of Athens’ most historic cafeterias, Green Park, is also located in the park.

== Renovation ==
Work began on a radical renovation of the Park in April 2008 although the people living nearby were rather dubious about the project and showed their opposition. The works for the reforming, under the guidance of the architect Alexandros Tompazis, were finally delivered on December 28, 2010. The reforming covered 25 hectares and cost 9.663.990 Euros, financed by the third EU Community Support Framework and national resources. There are now 1200 trees, 50000 flowers, 7500 topiaries and 2500 roses. Around one hectare of grass and another of flowers cover the ground where there used to be 22,650 square meters of tarmac. Apart from the plants, there are also 8,800 square meters of marble and 3,800 square meters of granite in big square blocks. Most of the changes affect the infrastructure, like the endless underground network of water supply, drainage, rainwater collection and electricity supply. At the same time, the area’s lighting was enhanced and upgraded. The renovation relied on the logic of the Park’s own history, given that it includes important monuments and sculptural works, all of which were cleaned on the basis of Ministry of Culture guidelines.
