= Leonidas Drosis =

Greek neoclassical sculptor

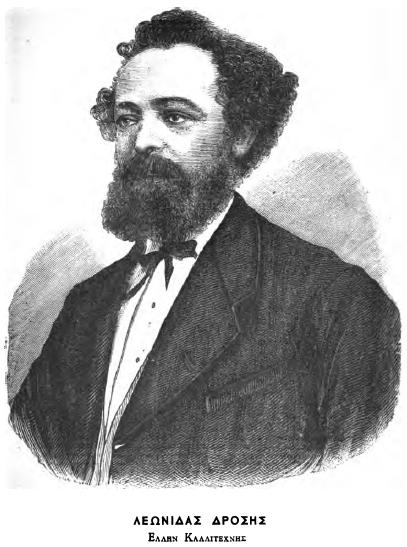
Leonidas Drosis

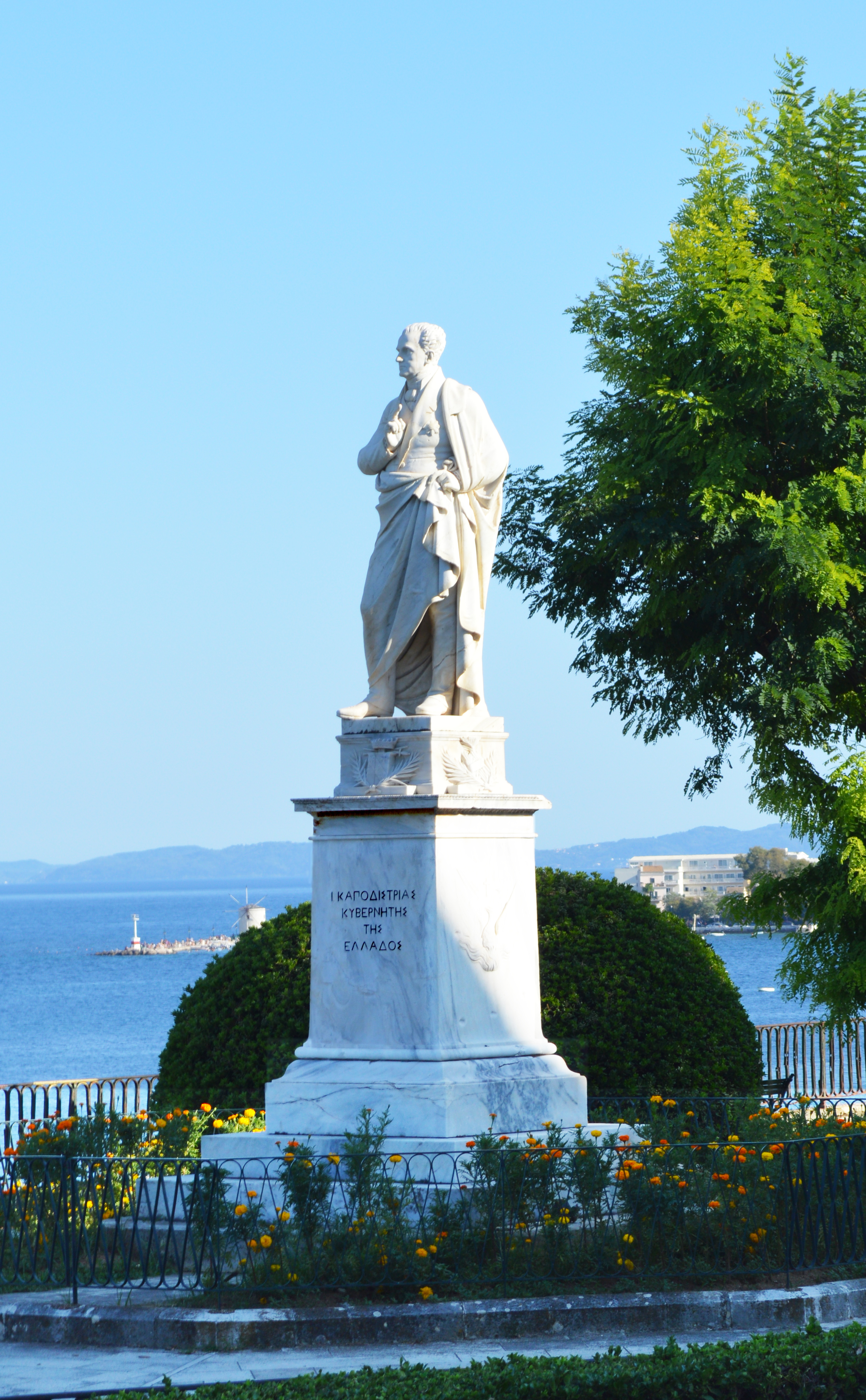
Ioannis Kapodistrias' statue in Corfu

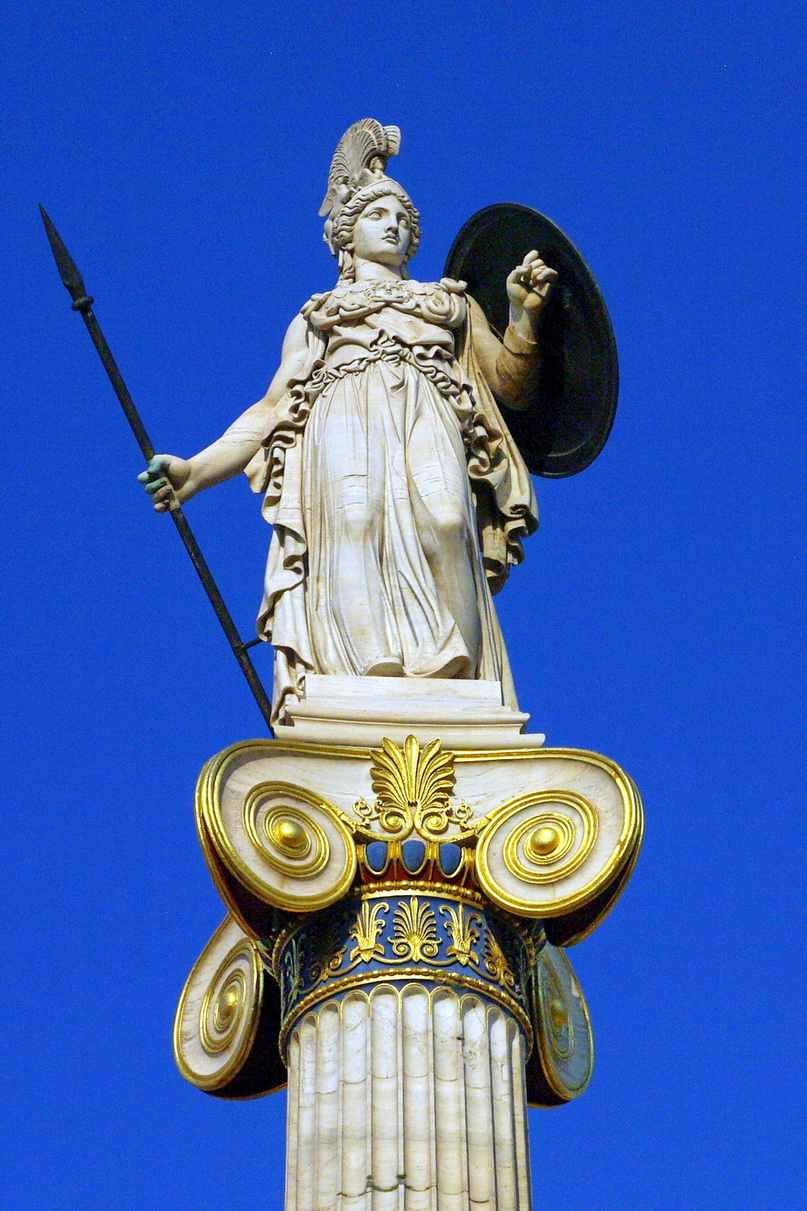
Close up view of the Athena column, Academy of Athens

Leonidas Drosis (Greek: Λεωνίδας Δρόσης; 1834/1836/1843 – 1882) was a Greek neoclassical sculptor of the 19th century.

Born in Tripoli or Nafplion, to a German (Bavarian) father named Von Dorsch, who was a soldier and musician, and a Greek mother named Meksi, he later took the Greek surname Drosis due to his love for Greece and because he identified solely as Greek. He later studied in Athens and Munich on a scholarship provided by Simon Sinas.

Drosis's major work is the extensive neo-classical architectural ornament at the Academy of Athens, for the Danish-Austrian architect Theophil Hansen. The academy was also funded largely by Sinas. Drosis sculpted the principle multi-figure pediment sculpture, on the theme of the birth of Athena, based on a design by painter Carl Rahl. This brought first prize at the Vienna Exhibition of 1873. Drosis is also responsible for the figures of Athena and Apollo Citharoedus on the academy's flanking pillars, and the seated marble figures of Plato and Socrates, which were executed "by the Italian sculptor Piccarelli" (the eight smaller pediments in the academy complex are the terra-cotta work of Austrian sculptor Franz Melnitzky).

Drosis died in Naples in 1882.

== Gallery ==
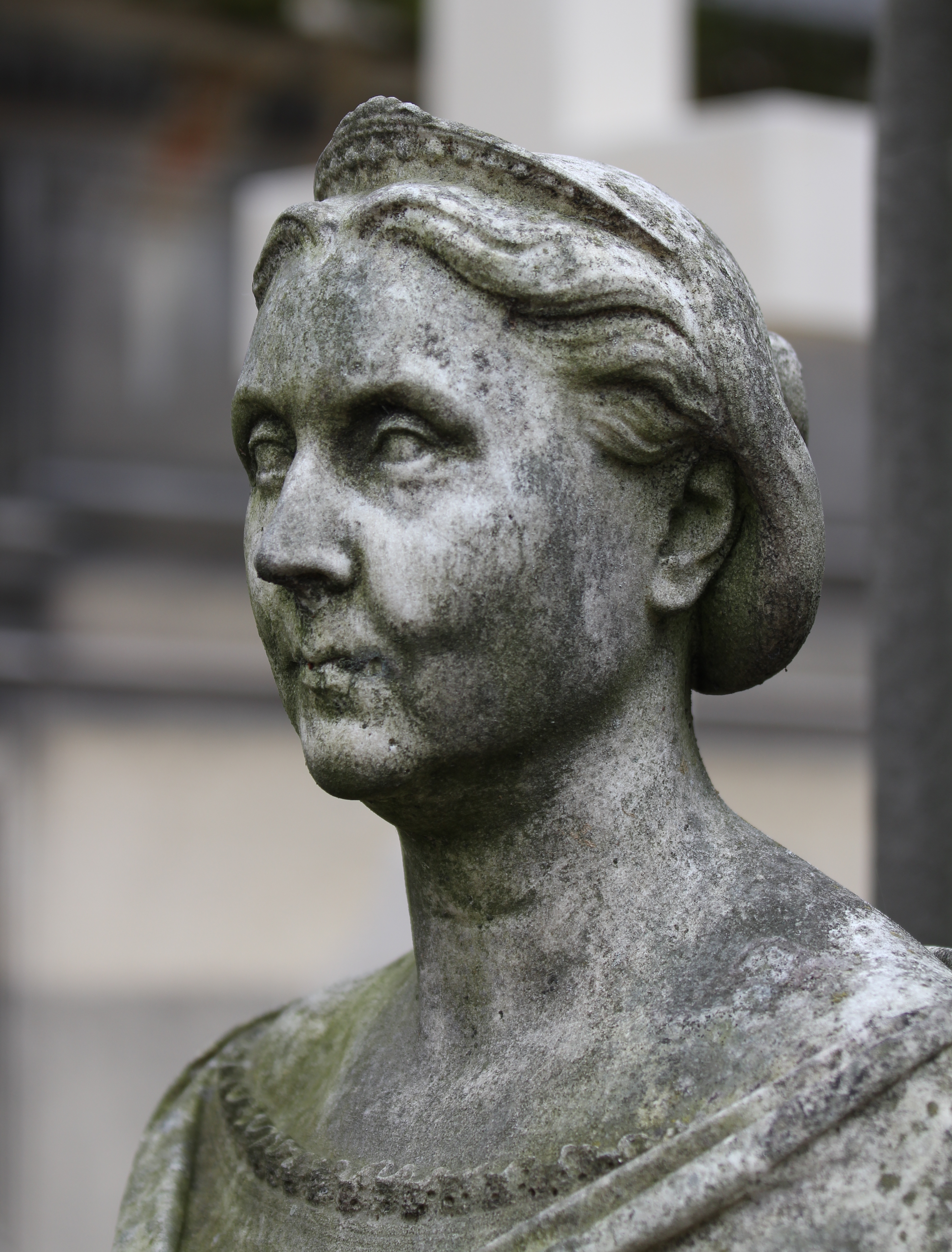
Tomb of Eugénie Boime-Simon

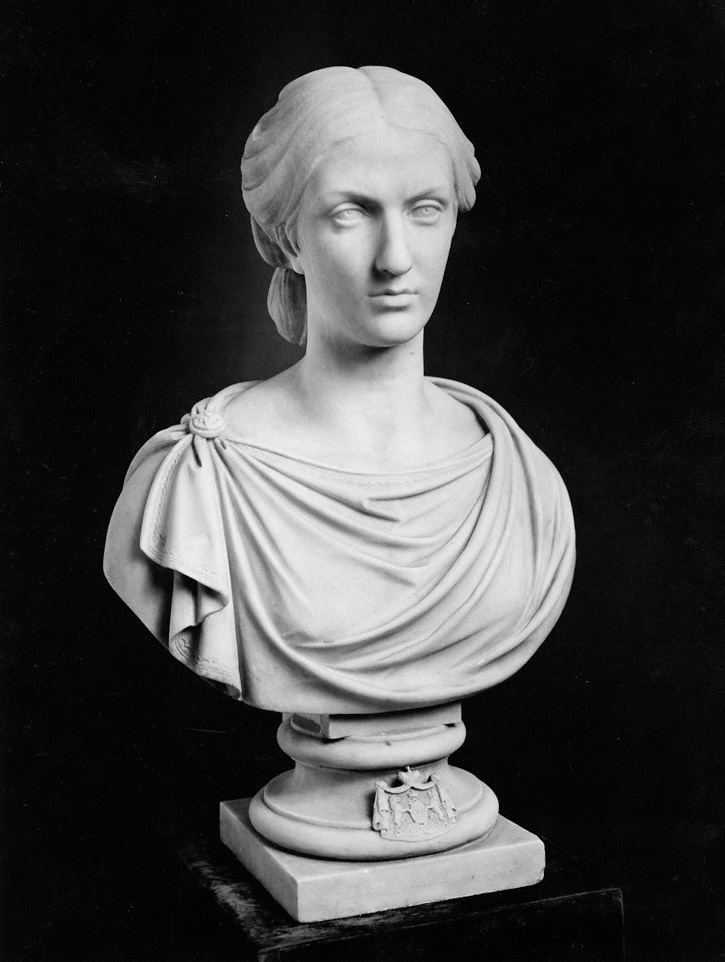
Irini Mavrokordatou

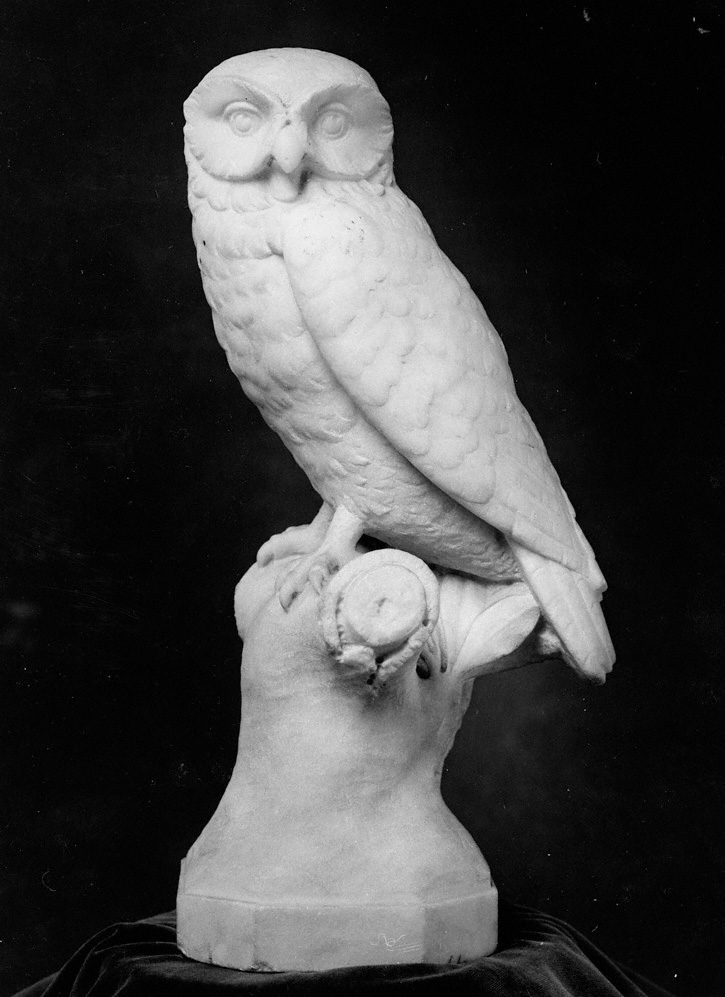
Owl

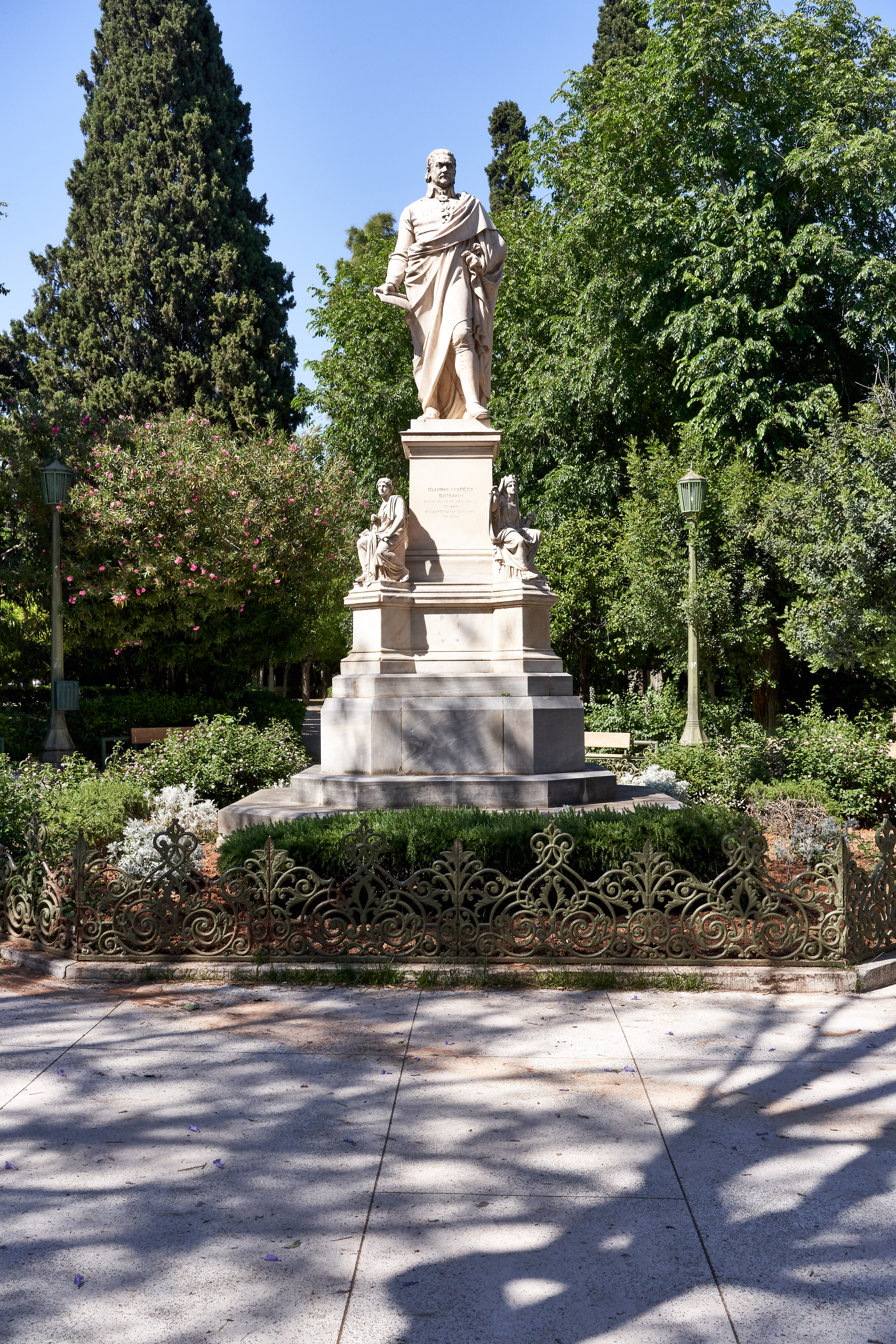
Ioannis Varvakis

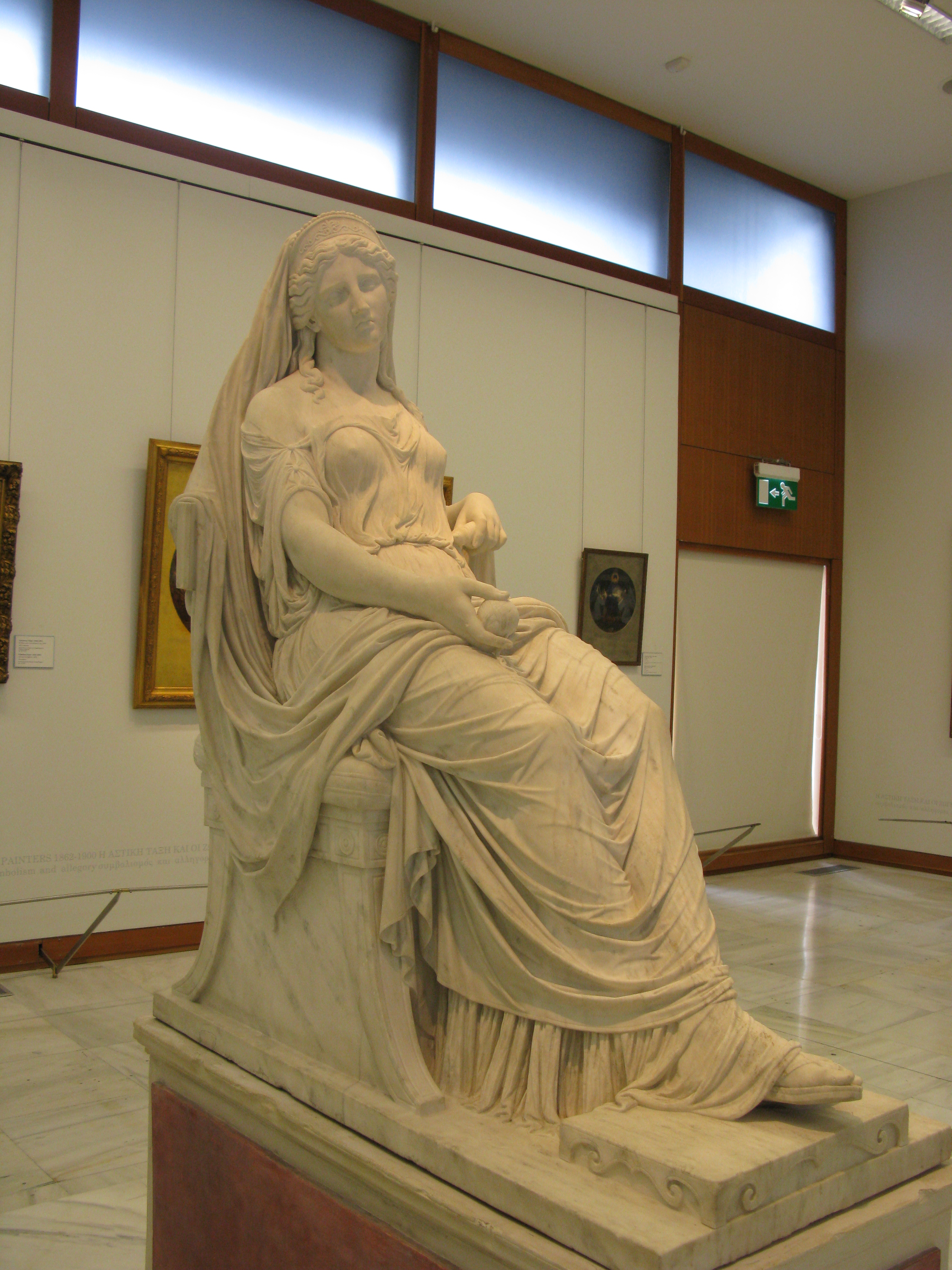
Penelope

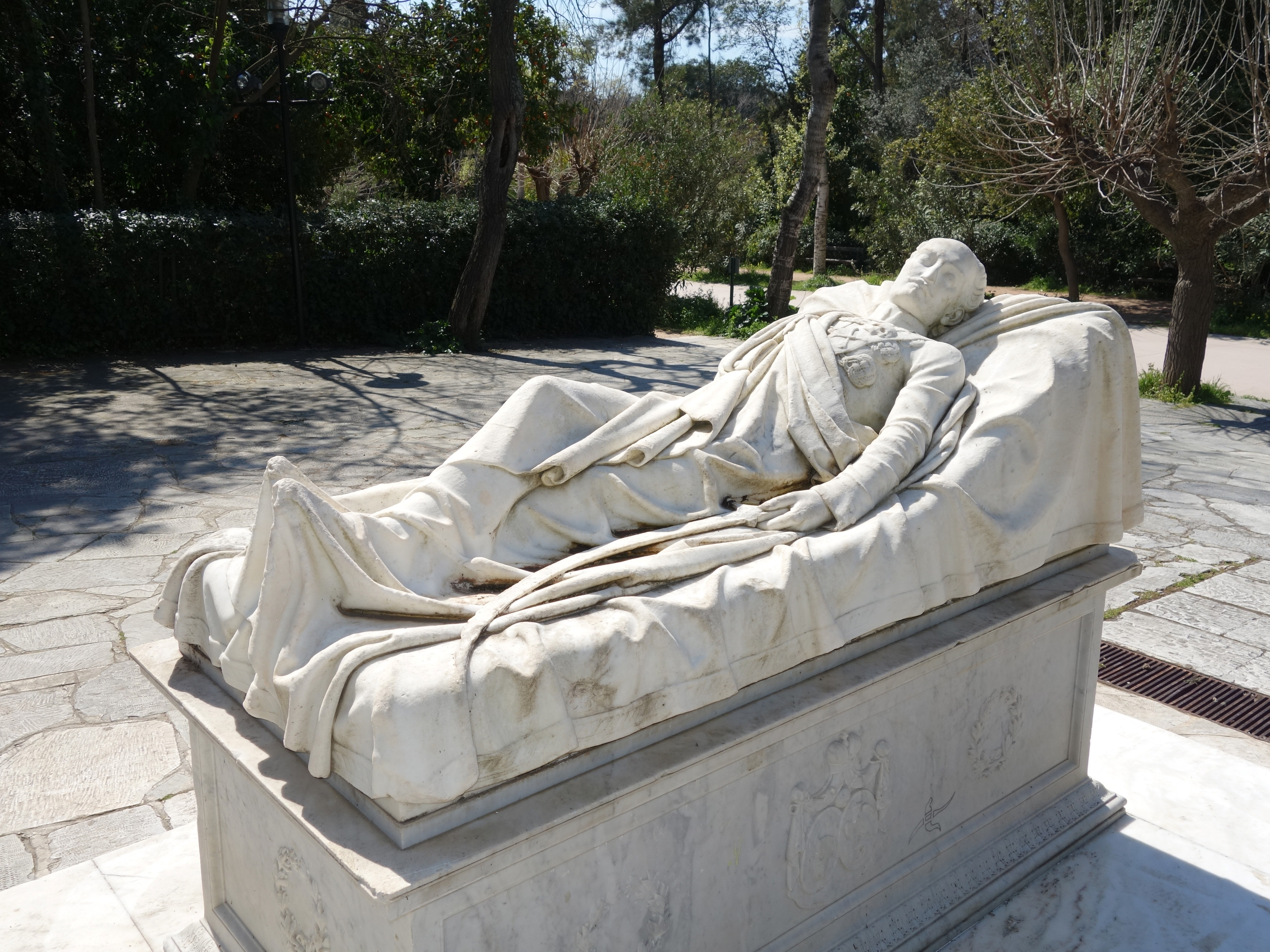
Ipsilanti Monument

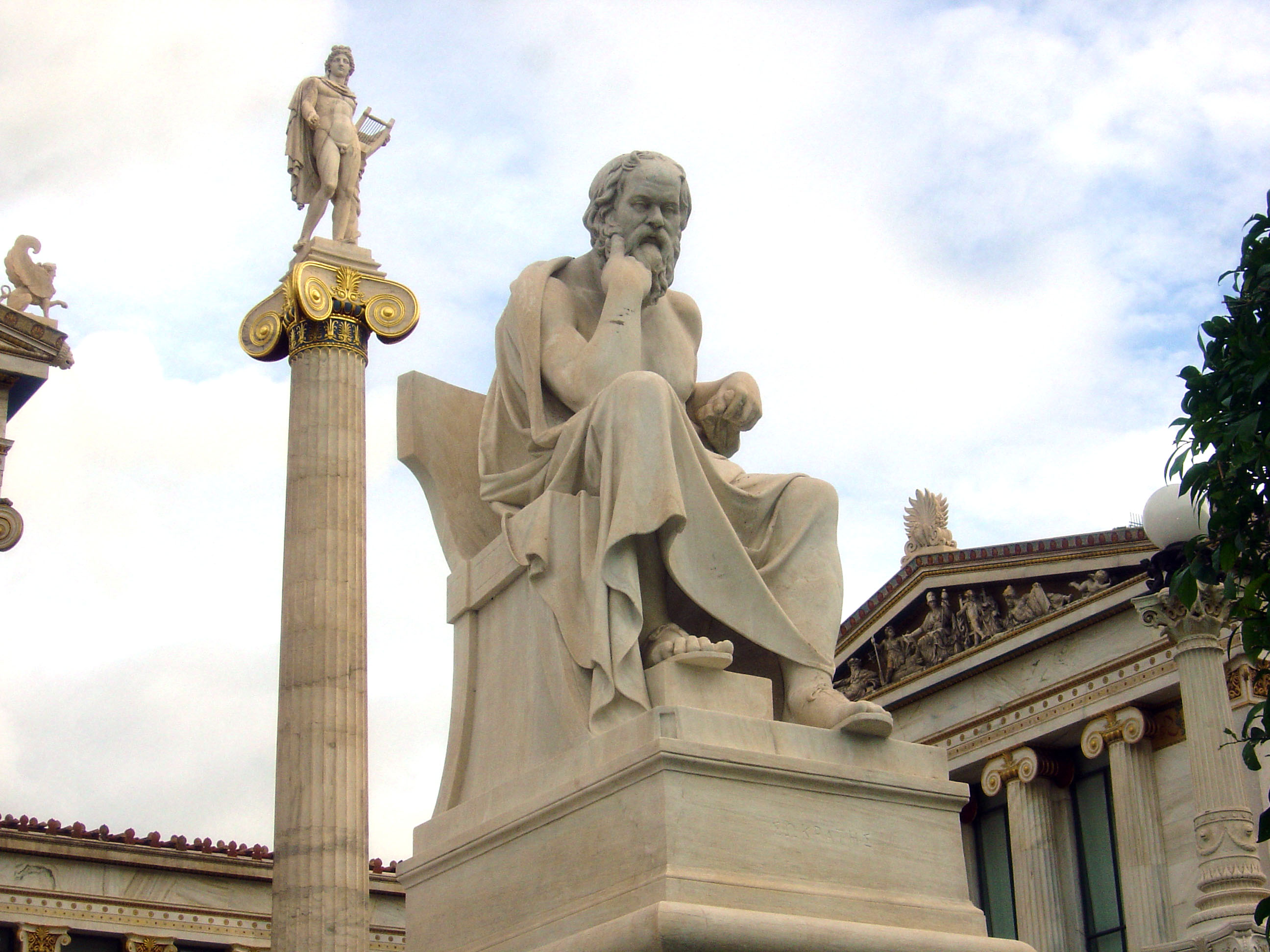
Socrates Academy of Athens

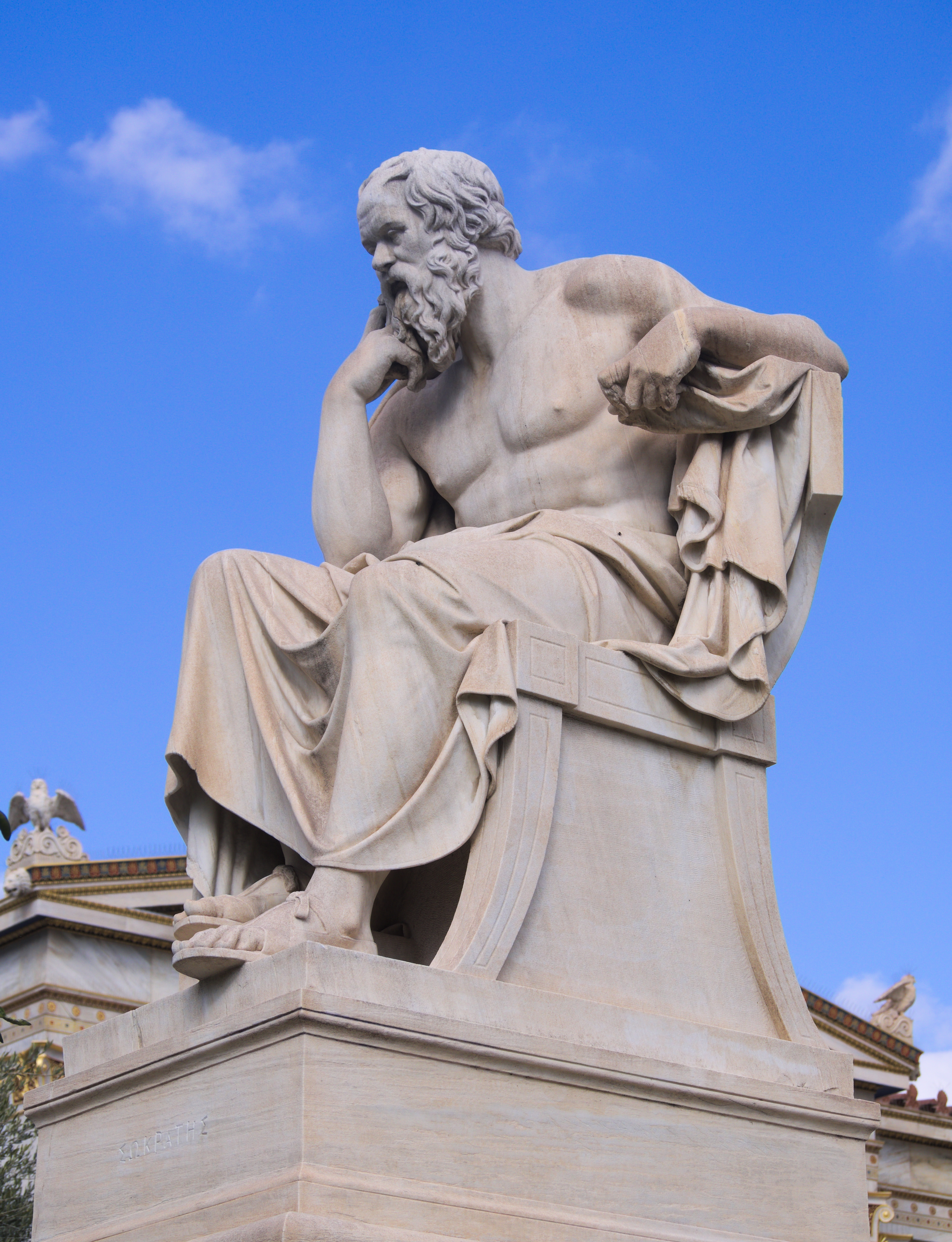
Socrates Academy of Athens

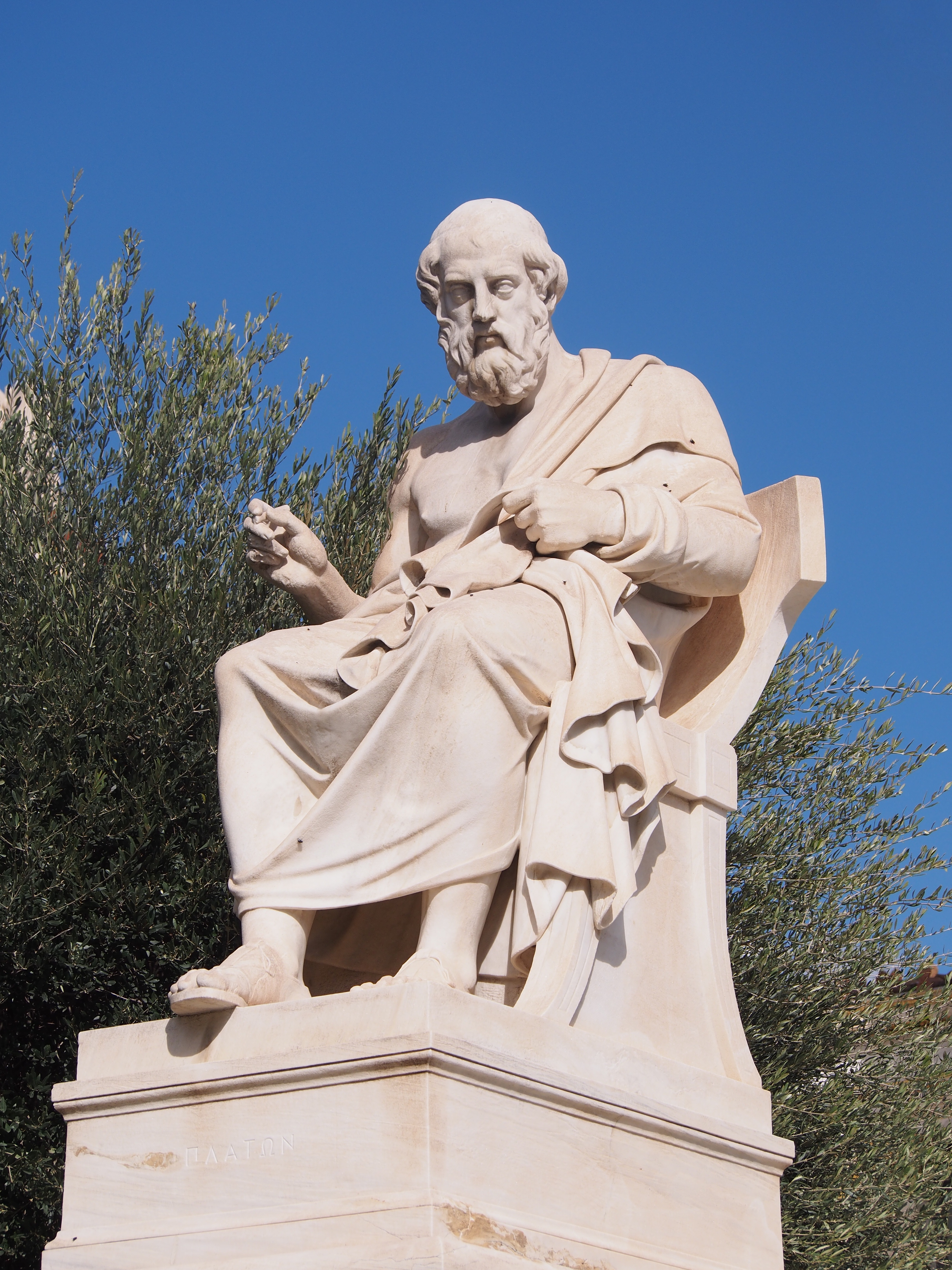
Plato Academy of Athens

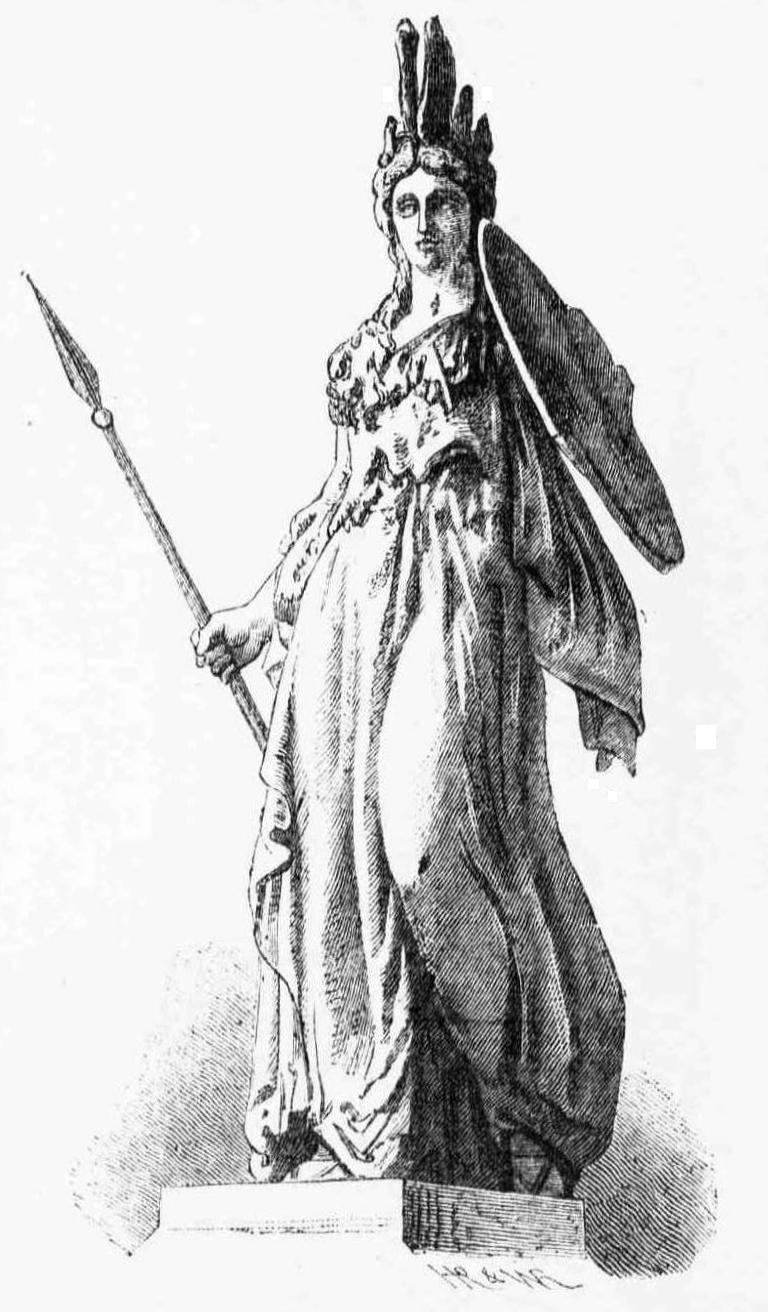
Sketch of Athena

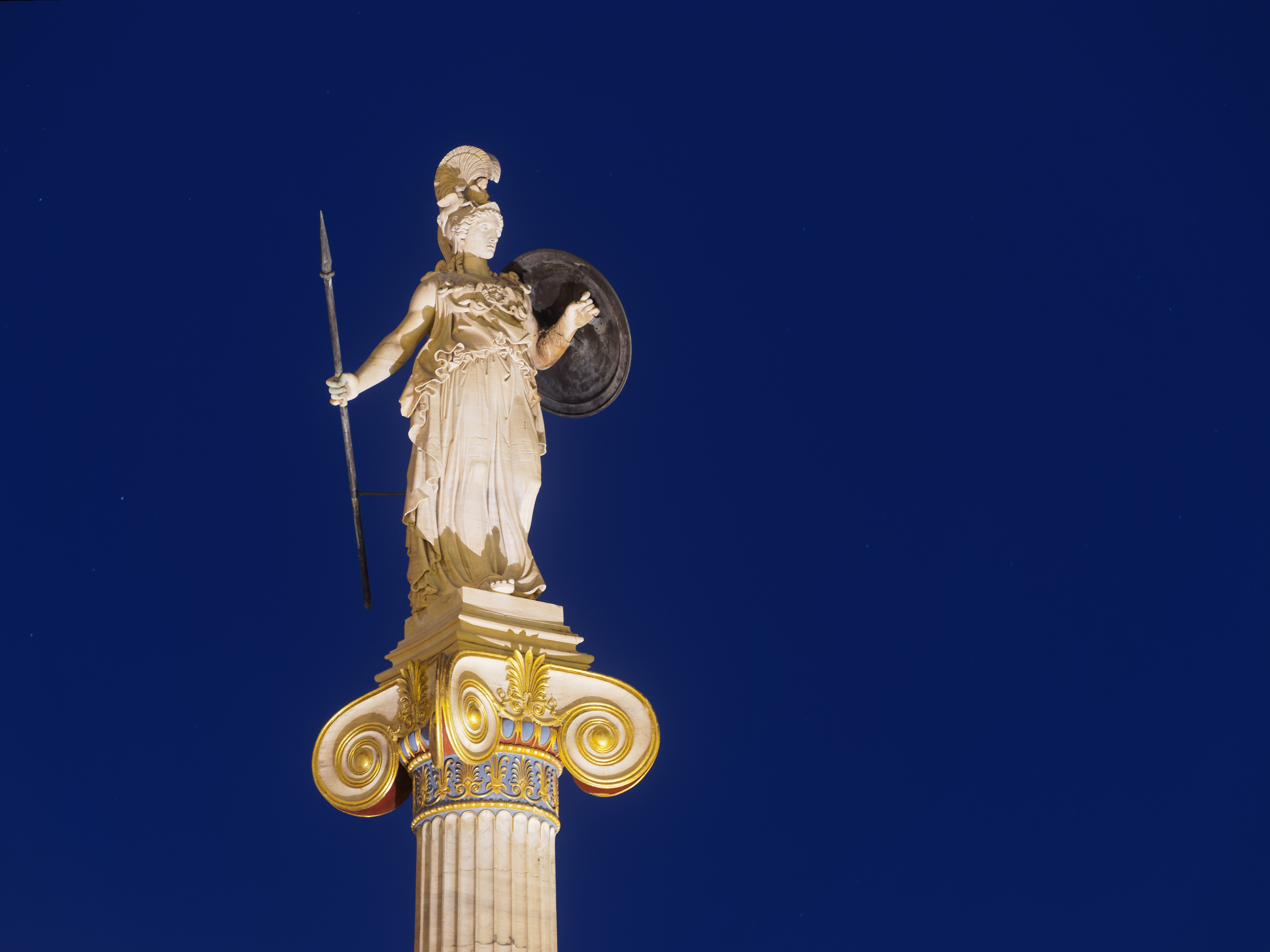
Athena w/ Ionic Column

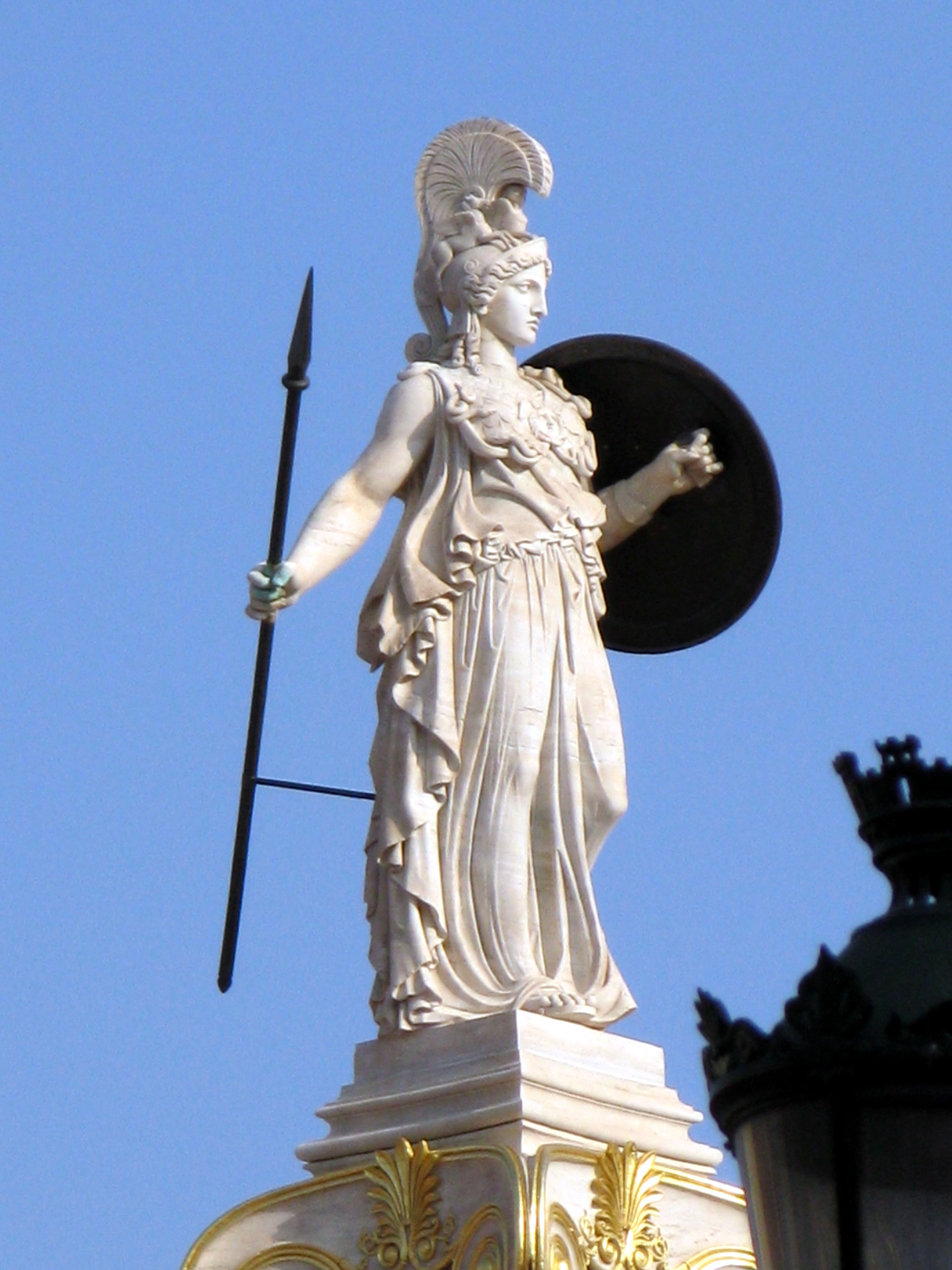
Athena Side View w/ Sphere

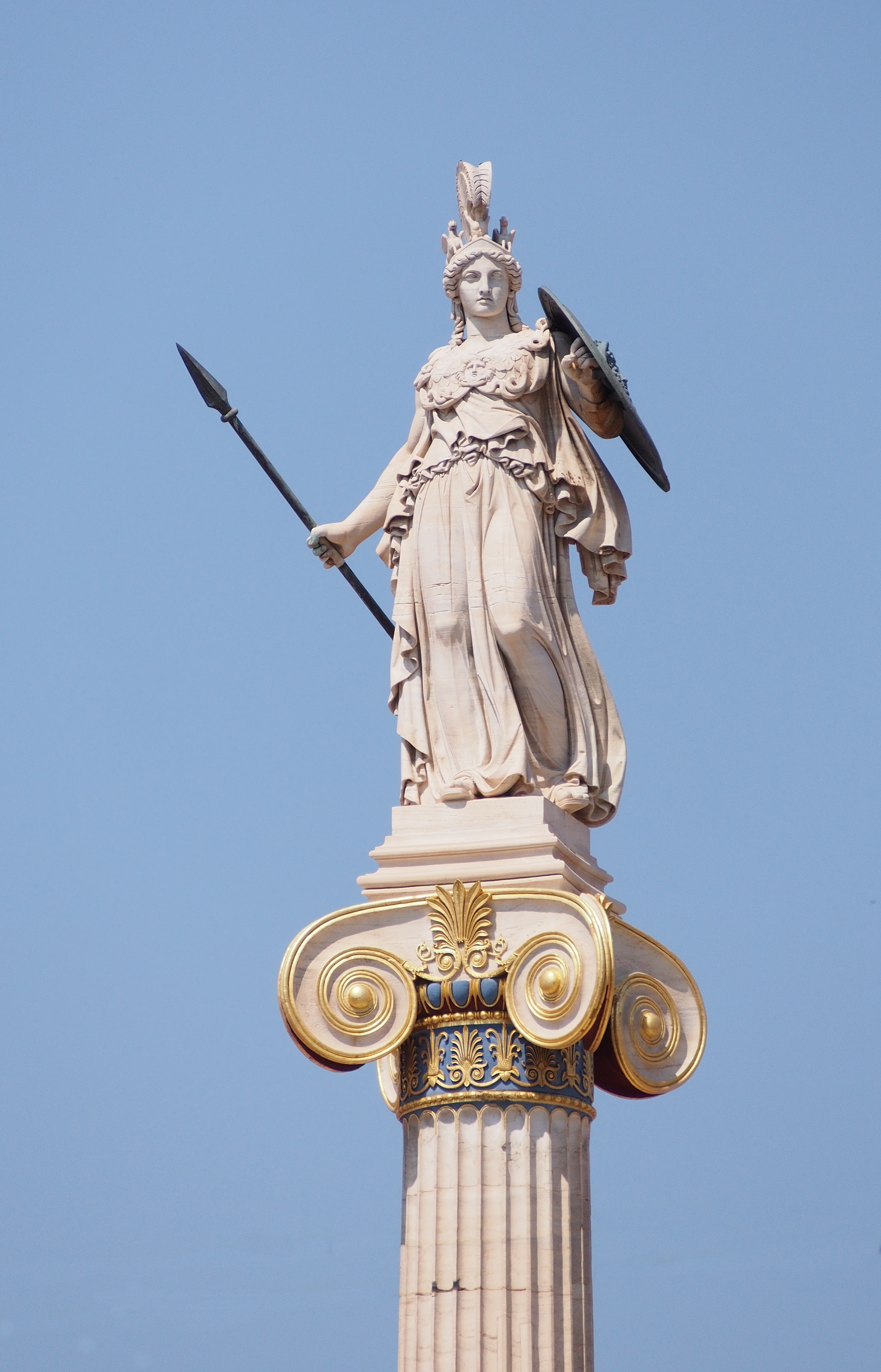
Athena Front View

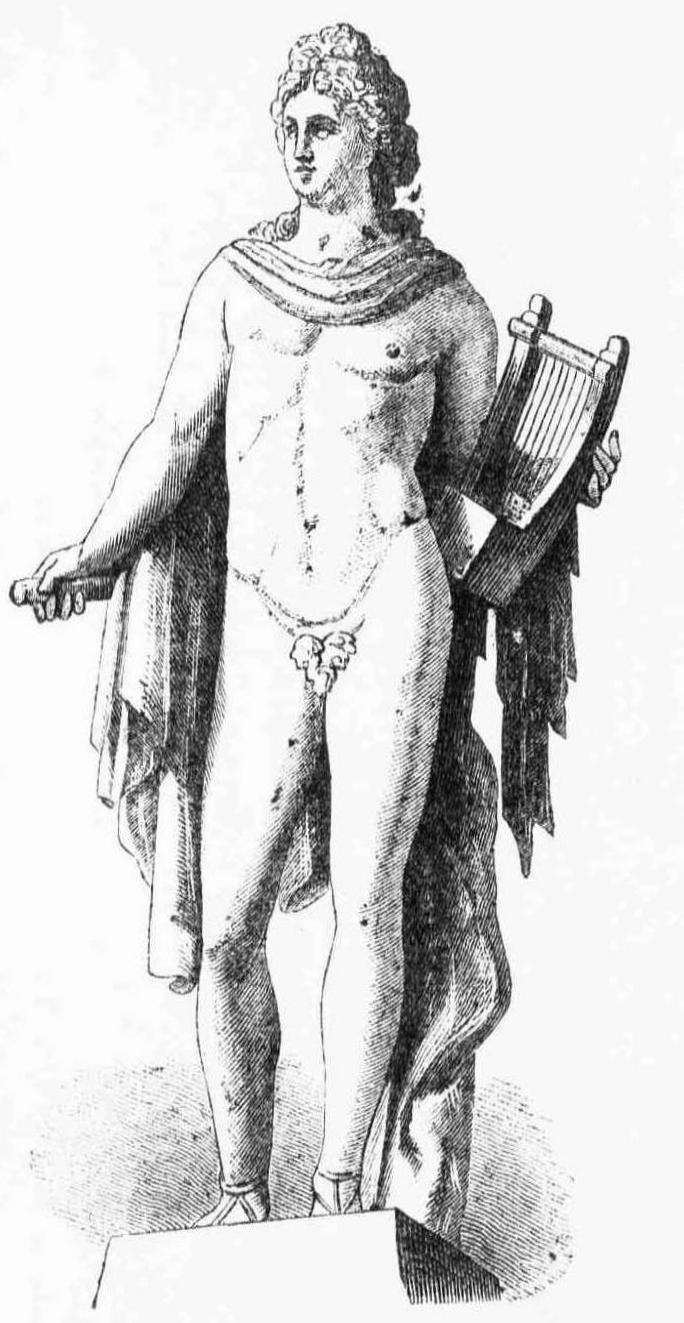
Sketch of Apollo

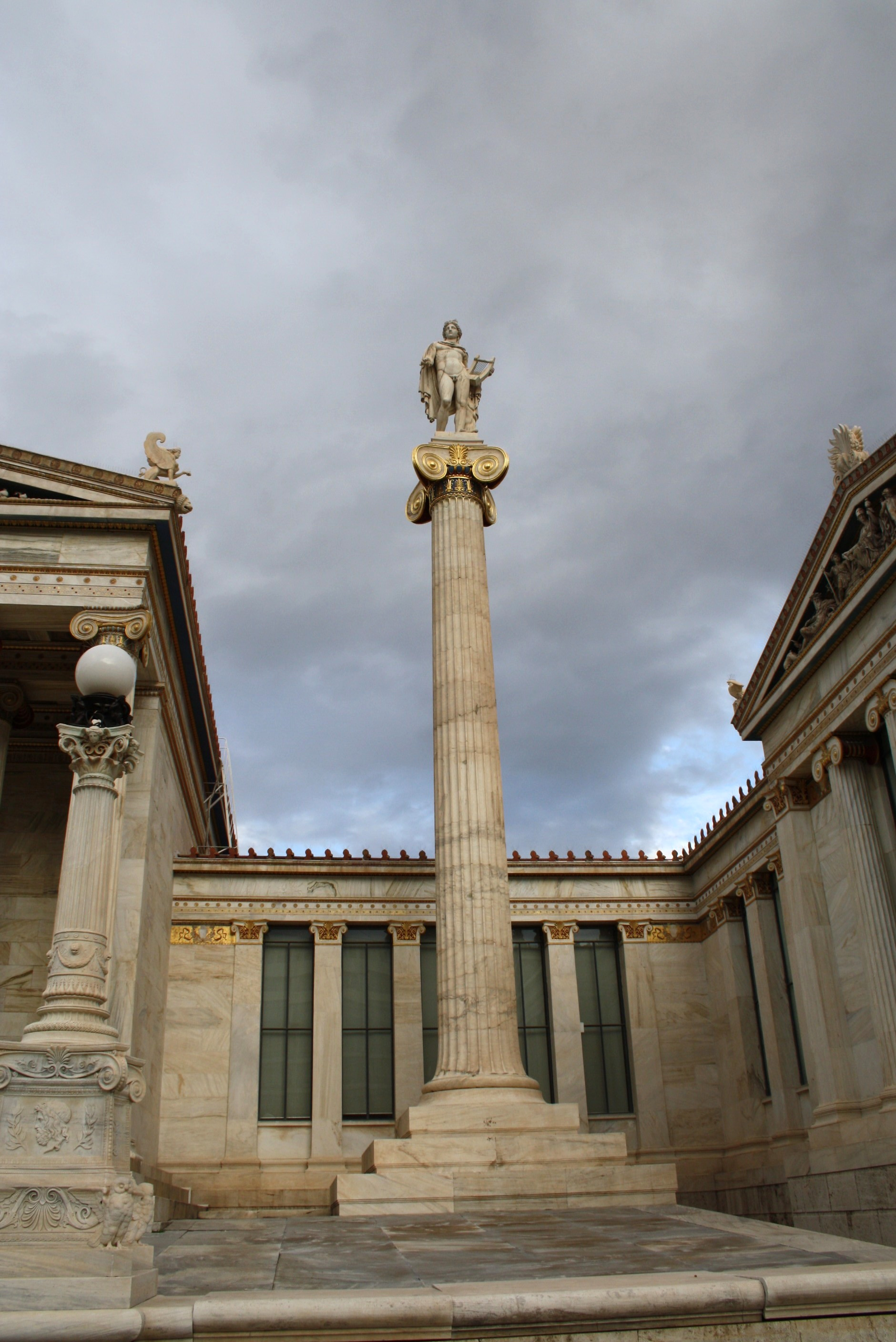
Apollo Full View Academy of Athens

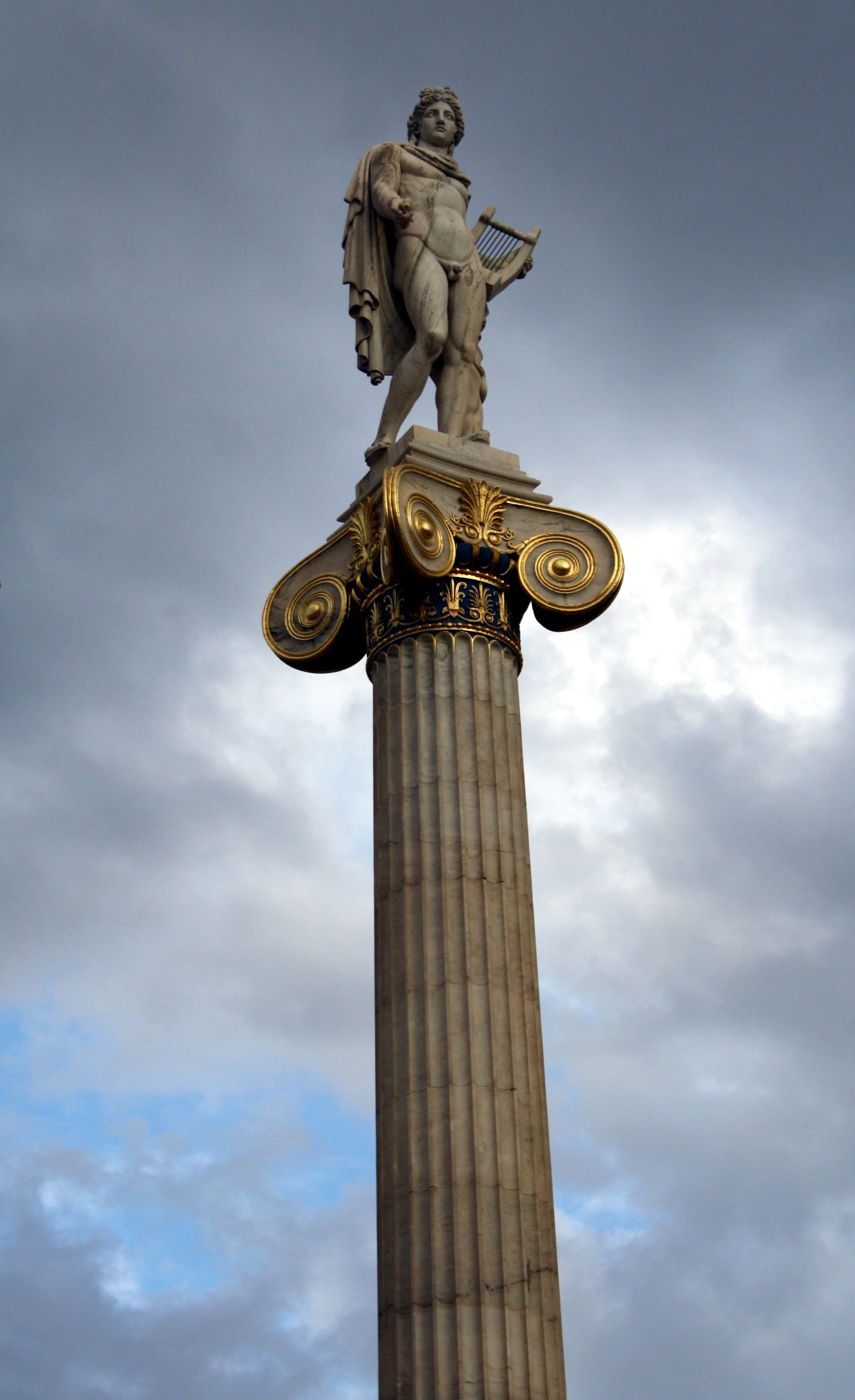
Apollo Half View Academy of Athens

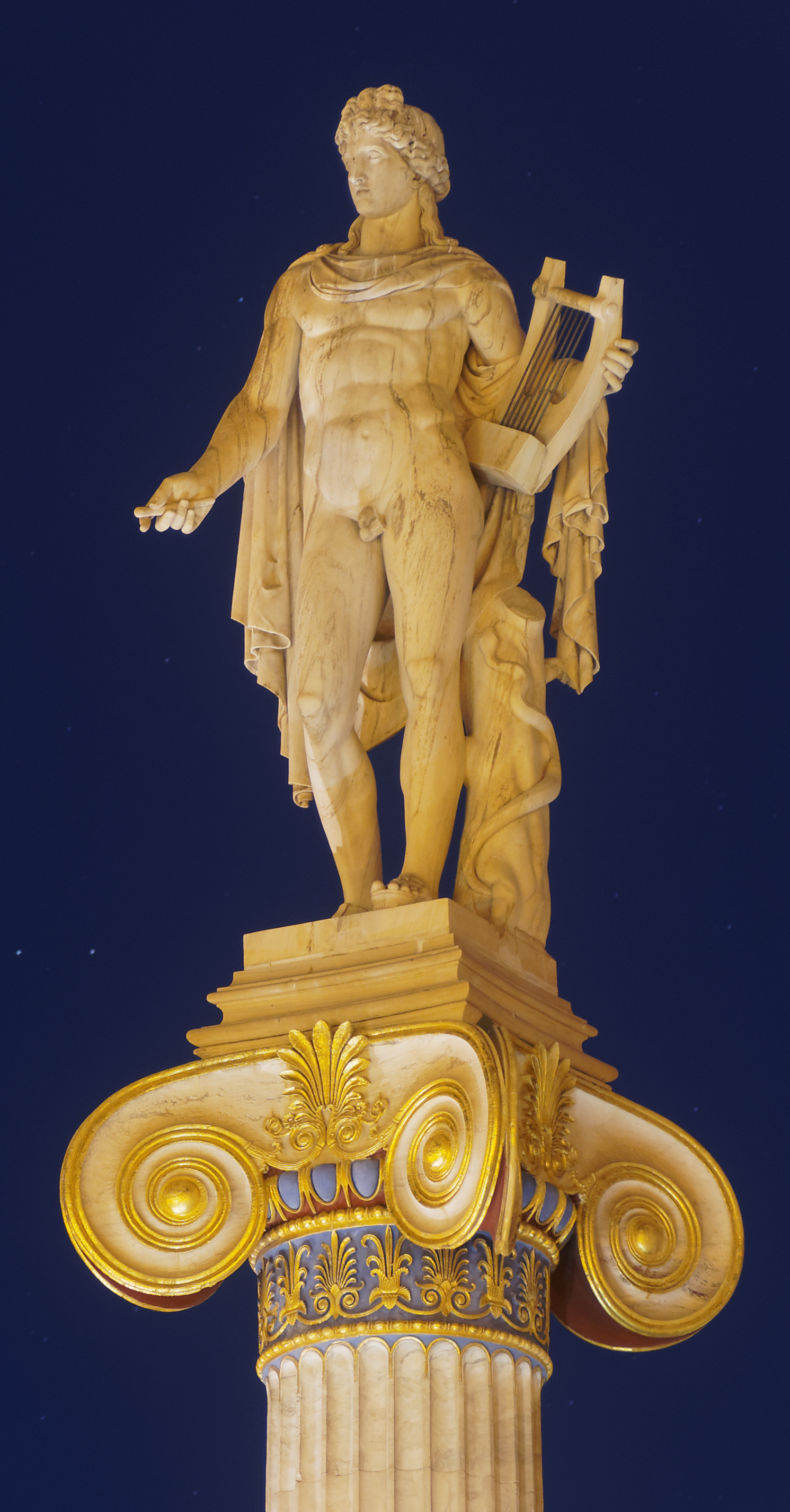
Apollo Close Up w/ Ionic Column

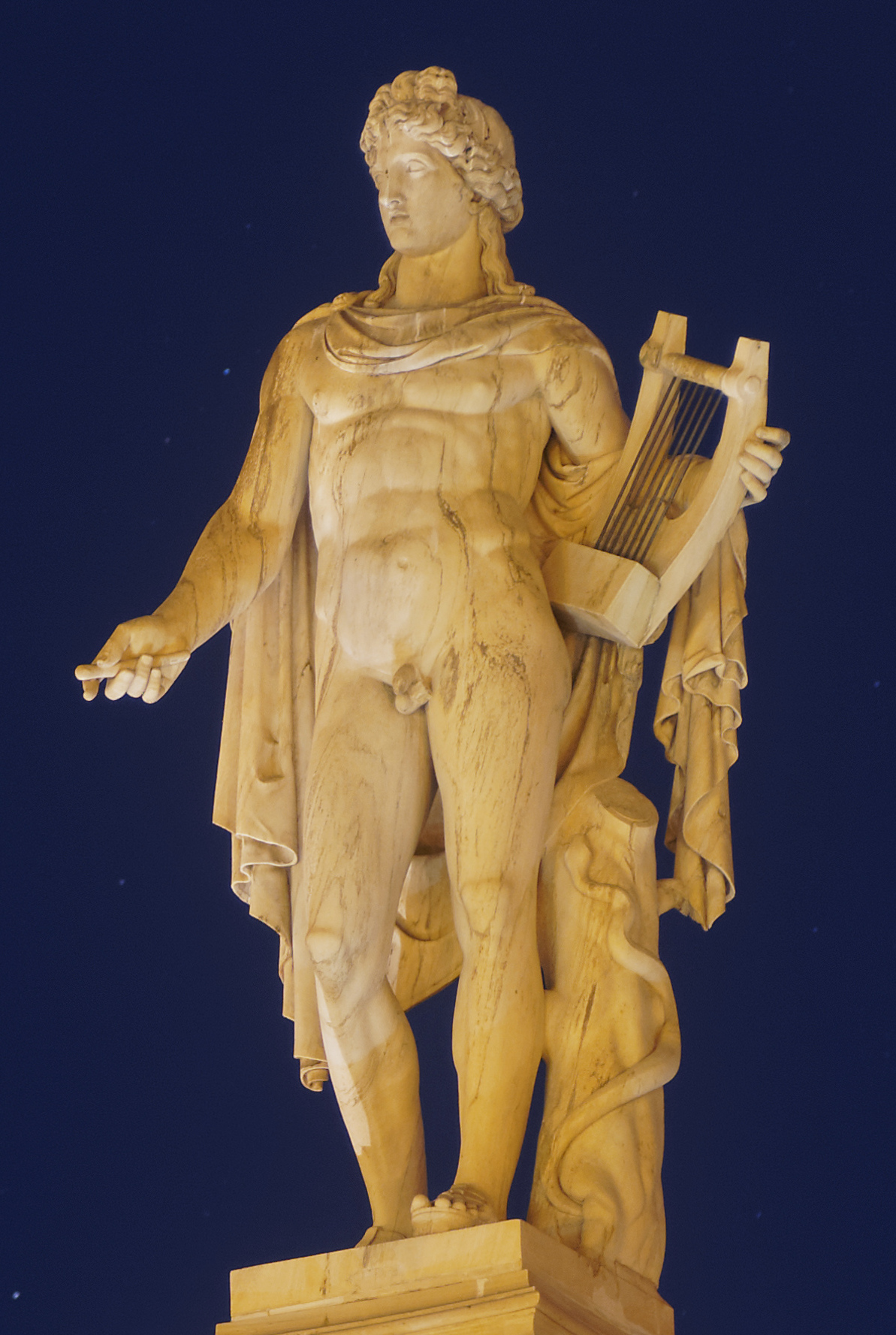
Apollo Close Up of Statue
