= Michael's bond =

Michael's bond (Romanian: Legătura lui Mihai) was a decree enacted by Michael the Brave that bonded the Wallachian serfs to the estate where they were living at that time.

Its exact meaning has been a matter of debate in Romanian historiography: the decree may have bonded some formerly free peasants, it may have only legislated the existing order, or it may have banned the return of runaway serfs to their previous estates.

== Sources ==
Some 18th century documents talk about a measure, named either așezământ (foundation) or legătură (bond), taken by Michael the Brave about the peasants in bondage living in villages owned by the boyars, the monasteries or the state.

The earliest document dates from April 24, 1613, through which Hospodar Radu Mihnea reinforces to the postelnics brothers Pârvu and Radu from Slăvitești the rights to two runaway serfs, who were claimed by their former owner, Ghinea the deacon. The decree is explained as bonding "for eternity" the serfs to wherever place they lived at the time of the legislation.

== Historiography ==
The 1613 document was considered by Nicolae Bălcescu to be a proof that Michael introduced serfdom to Wallachia, being forced by the landlords. A. D. Xenopol considered that it was merely a sanctioning of an existing practice. Constantin Giurescu argued that serfdom already existed for some time, so the measure only meant to abolish the right of landlords to retrieve the serfs who fled to other estates during the Sinan Pasha expedition against Michael the Brave. Michael may have had an urgent need for money to pay the mercenaries and the investigations and returning of the serfs to their original estates may have delayed the paying of taxes. Ioan C. Filitti supported the conclusions of Giurescu, but argued that the decree may have been used to make serfs from previously free peasants who settled in villages during the war of 1595. Petre P. Panaitescu considered that the decree meant the bonding of peasants to the land, the abolition of the right to change estate and that peasants who previously had a contract with the landlord were assimilated with serfs, using as argument a treaty prior to Sinan's expedition.

Constantin C. Giurescu and Dinu C. Giurescu argued that while Michael did not introduce nor strengthened serfdom in Wallachia, the increases in taxes meant that previously free peasants were forced to sell or lost their land, and with it, they lost their freedom, becoming serfs. Some villages became property of the boyars or they were taken over by the Hospodar for not paying their taxes. Michael himself bought 149 villages, of which 113 of formerly free peasants, for at least a quarter of which the peasants complained that they were made serfs unwillingly.
