= Kalpak =

High-crowned cap

The kalpak, qalpaq or calpack, (Note: Karakalpak: калпак; Turkish: kalpak [kaɫˈpak]; Kazakh: қалпақ, Kyrgyz: калпак, both [qɑlˈpɑq]; Bulgarian: калпак [kɐɫˈpak]; Greek: καλπάκι, romanized: kalpáki [kalˈpaci]; Polish: kołpak [ˈkɔwpak]; Russian: колпак, romanized: kolpak [kɐlˈpak]; Ukrainian: ковпак, romanized: kovpak [kou̯ˈpɑk].) is a Turkic high-crowned cap (usually made of felt or sheepskin) worn throughout Central Asia and the Caucasus.

The kalpak is used to keep the head warm in winter and shade out the sun during summer. There are different kalpaks for different seasons, with kalpaks used in winter being thicker and the ones used in summer being thinner but broader for shading purposes.

== Description ==
There are many styles of kalpak. They usually can be folded flat for keeping or carrying when not being worn. The brim can be turned up all the way around. Sometimes there is a cut in the brim so that a two-pointed peak can be formed. Plain white ones are often reserved for festivals and special occasions. Those intended for everyday use may have a black velvet lining. In the Turkic cultures of central Asia, they have a sharp tapering to resemble a mountain, rather than the cyndrical kalpaks of Turkey.

The word kalpak is etymologically Turkic. According to Armenian lexicographer Sevan Nişanyan, it means felt cap. According to Turkish Turcologist and lexicographer Hasan Eren, it means cap made of leather, fur or fabric. The word kalpak has passed from Turkish to Bulgarian, Serbian, Greek, Hungarian, Persian, Tajik, Polish, French, German, Russian and other Slavic languages. The oldest informations about Turkic peoples wearing kalpak is found in ancient Chinese sources. Turkic lexicographer Mahmud al-Kashgari wrote in his Turkic dictionary named Dīwān Lughāt al-Turk, written in the 11th century, that it was very common for Turks to wear a kalpak. Based on this, it would not be wrong to say that kalpak is a Turkic origin cap and the national cap of Turkic people and later passed on to other peoples.

The word kalpak is also a component of the ethnonym of a Turkic group of uncertain relation: the "Karakalpak" (literally "black kalpak" in the Karakalpak language).

In Russian, Persian and Polish, the word is also used for hubcap (for a car wheel's hub; see also the Wiktionary entry hubcap).

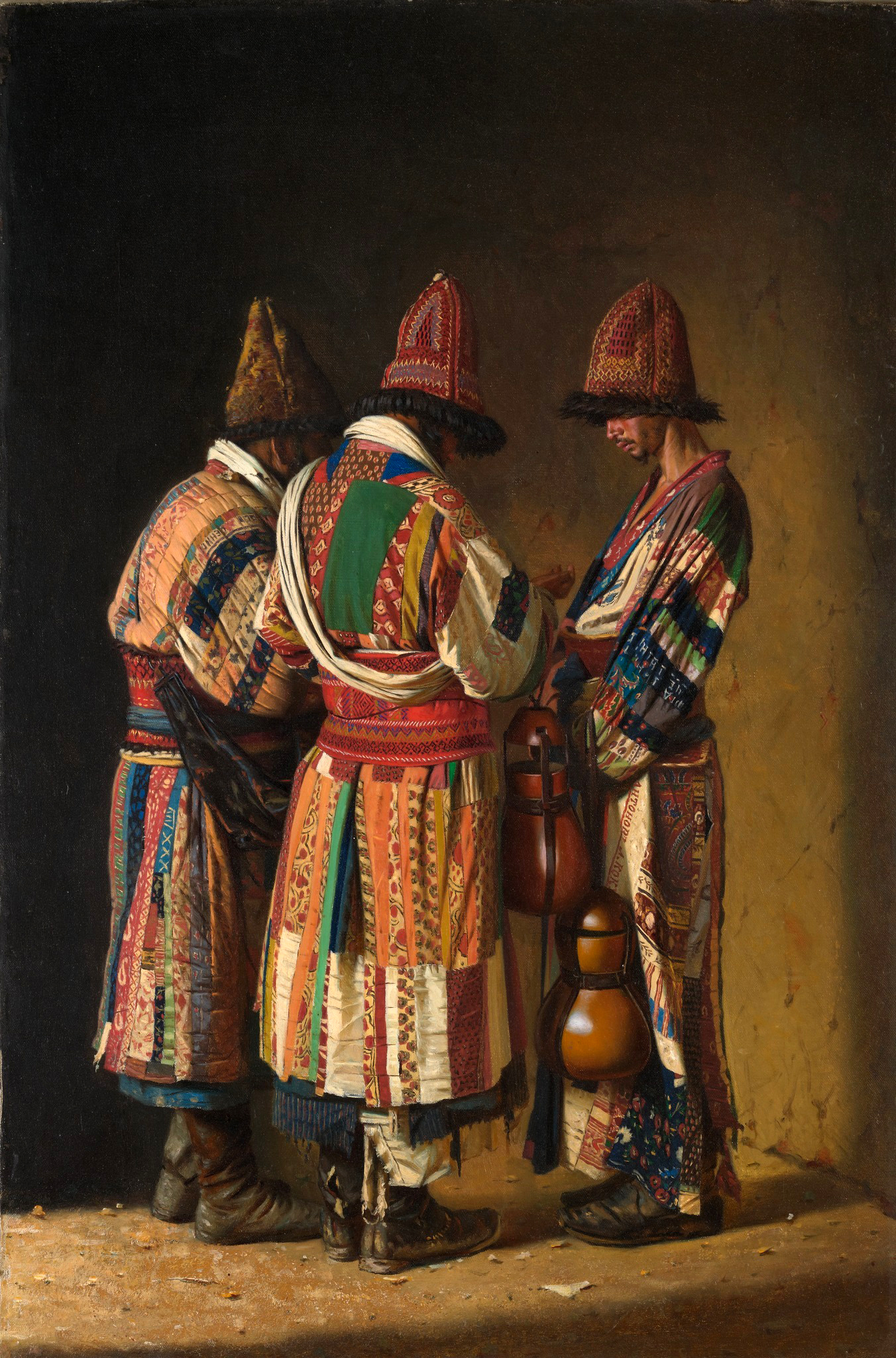
Dervishes, by Vereshchagin

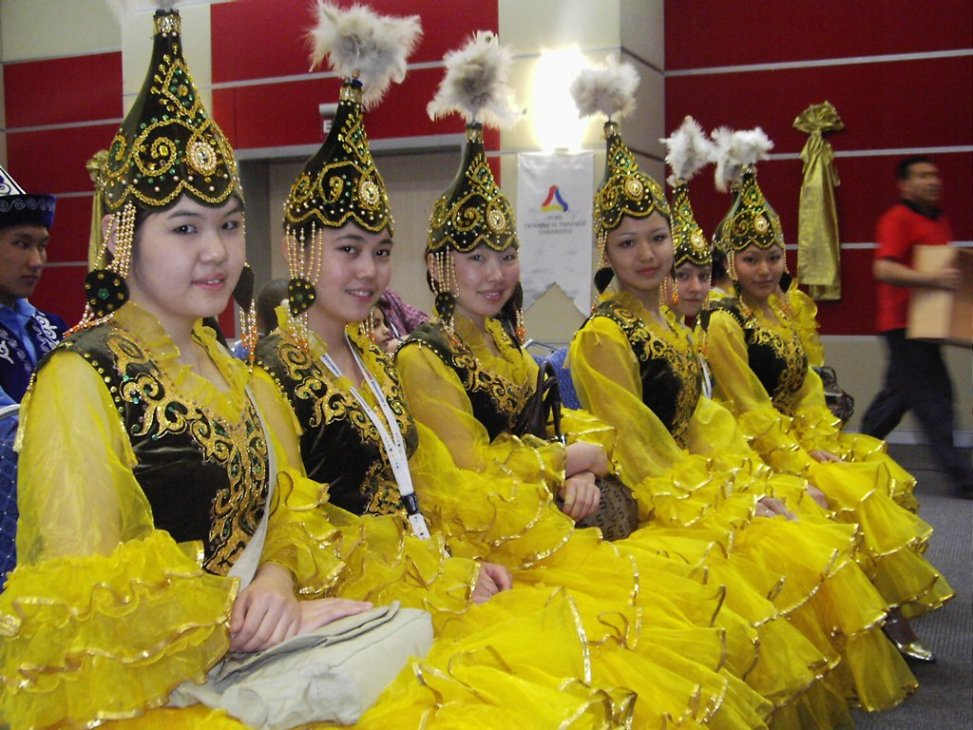
Traditional headgear of unmarried woman in Kazakhstan, Karakalpakstan and Kyrgyzstan

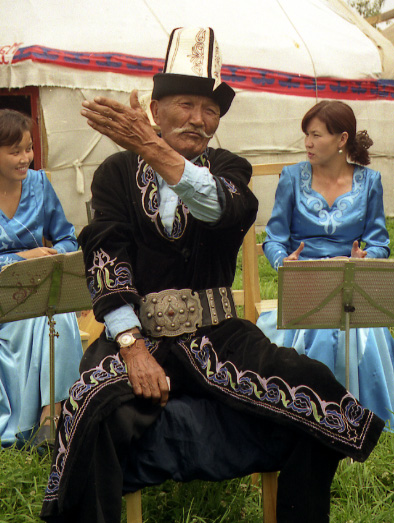
A Kyrgyz Manaschi wears a white kalpak for a special occasion

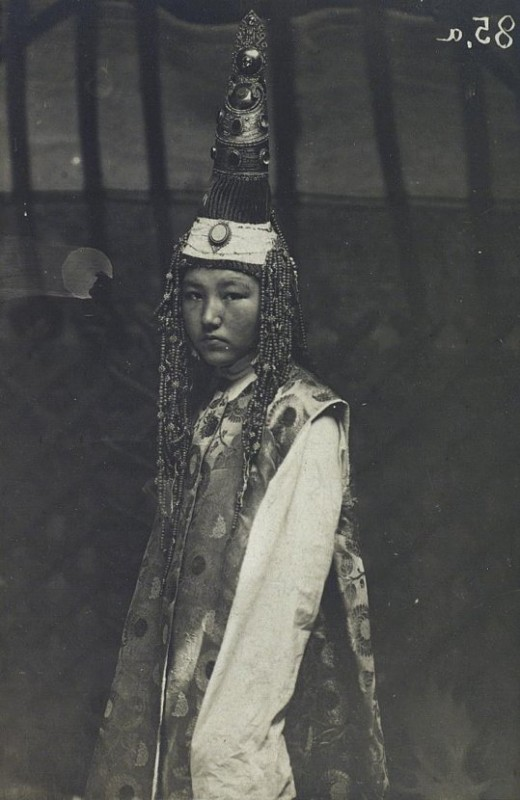
Special wedding kalpak Saukele of a bride (Kazakh: сәукеле, Kyrgyz: шөкүлө, Karakalpak: sáwkele)

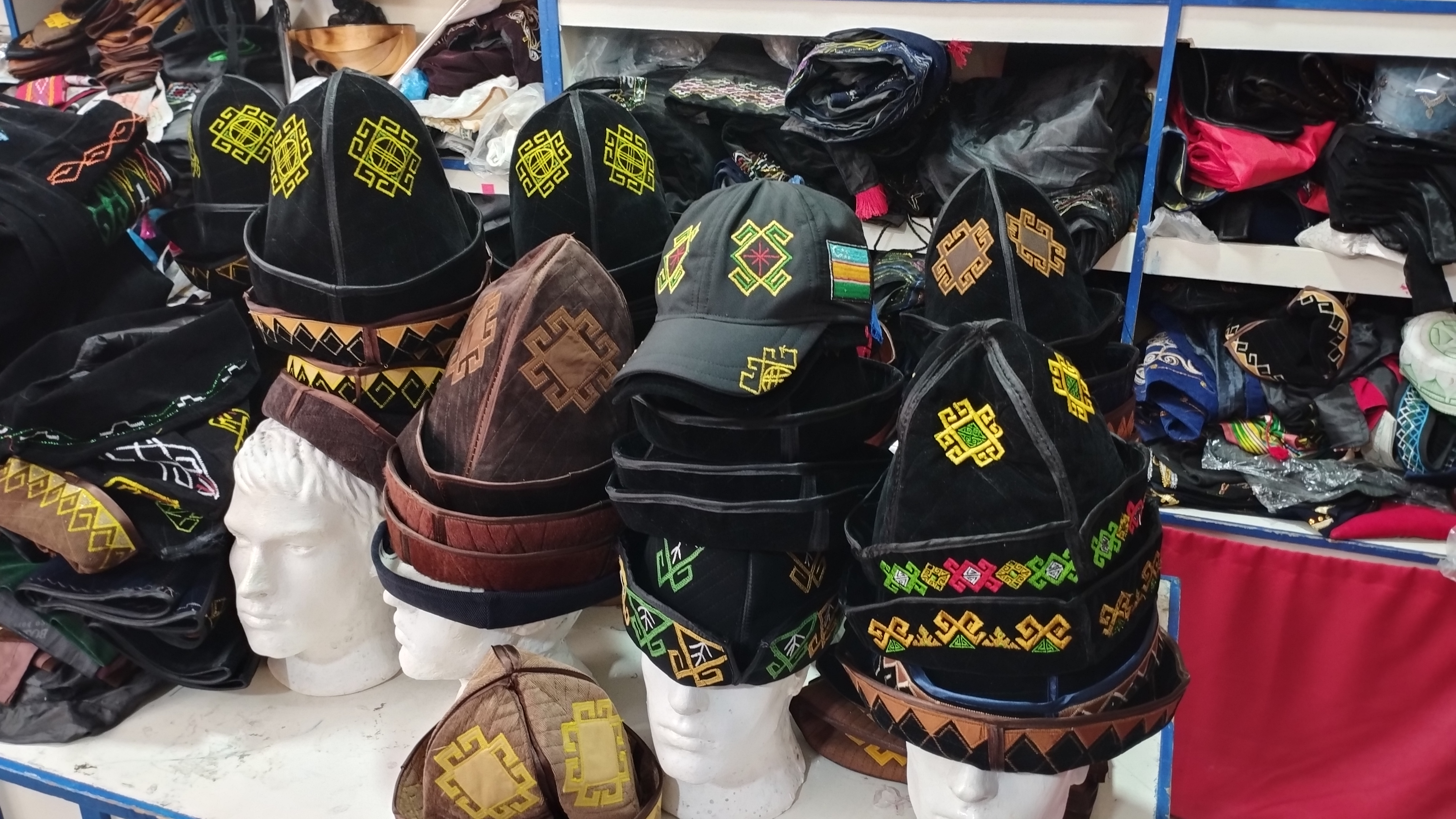
Black kalpaks of Karakalpaks

== See also ==
- Bashlyk
- Busby (military headdress)
- Gugiuman
- Işlic
- Kalfak (ru:Калфак, tt:Калфак)
- Karakul (hat)
- Kolpik
- Kurhars (ru:Курхарс)
- List of hat styles
- List of fur headgear
- List of headgear
- Papakha
- Phrygian cap
- Saukele (kk:Сәукеле, ky:Шөкүлө, ru:Саукеле)
