= Panaitescu =

Panaitescu is a Romanian surname. Notable people with the surname include:

- Perpessicius, the pen name of Dumitru S. Panaitescu
- Petre P. Panaitescu (1900–1967), Romanian literary historian
