= Boyars of Moldavia and Wallachia =

Nobility of the historical principalities of Moldavia and Wallachia

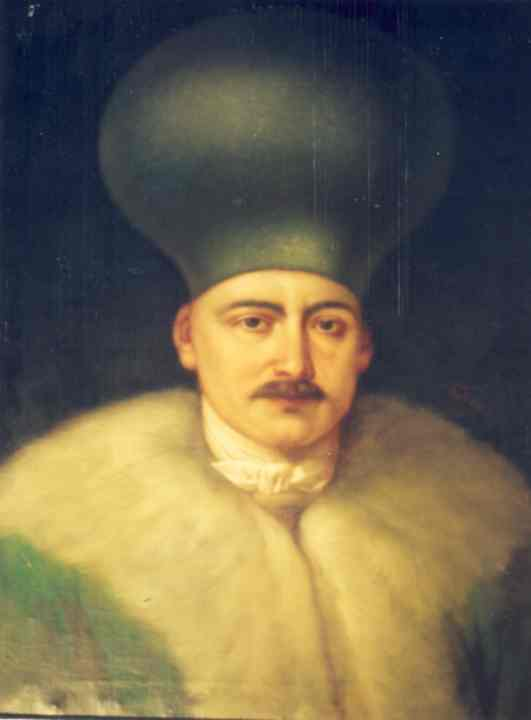
Vornic Șerban Grădișteanu wearing an işlic, an indication of his boyar rank

The boyars of Moldavia and Wallachia were the nobility of the Danubian Principalities of Moldavia and Wallachia. The title was either inherited or granted by the Hospodar, often together with an administrative function. The boyars held much of the political power in the principalities and, until the Phanariote era, they elected the Hospodar.

As such, until the 19th century, the system oscillated between an oligarchy and an autocracy with power concentrated in the Hospodar's hands.

== History ==
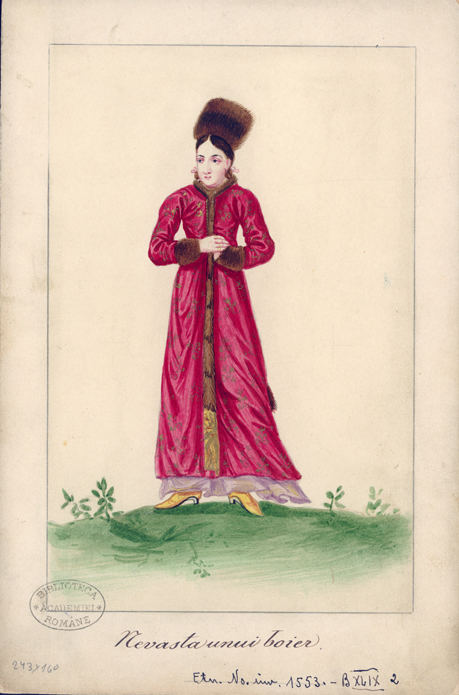
A boyar's wife; drawing of 1729

=== Origins ===
During the Middle Ages, Romanians lived in autonomous communities called obște which mixed private and common ownership, employing an open field system.

The private ownership of land gained ground In the 14th and 15th centuries, leading to differences within the obște towards a stratification of the members of the community.

The creation of the feudal domain in which the landlords were known as boyars, was mostly through danii ("donations") system: the Hospodars gave away whole villages to military servants, usurping the right of property of the obște.

By the 16th century, the few remaining still-free villages were forcefully taken over by boyars, while some people were forced to agree to become serfs (see Serfdom in Moldavia and Wallachia) due to hunger, invasions, high taxes, debts, which further deteriorated the economic standing of the free peasants.

Apart from the court boyars and the military elite, some boyars ("countryside boyars") arose from within the villages, when a leader of the obște (usually called knyaz) swore fealty to the hospodar and becoming the landlord of the village.

=== Feudal era ===
The Hospodar was considered the supreme ruler of the land and he received a land rent from the peasants, who also had to pay a rent to the boyar who owned the land. The boyars were generally excepted from any taxes and rents to be paid to the Hospodar. The boyars were entitled to a rent that was a percentage of the peasants' produce (initially one-tenth, hence its name, dijmă) in addition to a number of days of unpaid labour (corvée, locally known as clacă or robotă).

However, not all landlords who owned villages were boyars, a different class existed of landlords without a boyar title, called cneji or judeci in Wallachia and nemeși in Moldavia. They were however not tax-exempt like the boyars. The upper boyars (known as vlastelin in Wallachia) had to supply the hospodar with a number of warriors proportional to the number of villages they owned.

Some boyars were court officials, the office being called dregătorie, while others were boyars without a function. Important offices at the court that were held by boyars included vistier (treasurer), stolnic (pantler), vornic (concierge) and logofăt (chancellor). While early the court officials were not important and often they were not even boyars, with time, boyars started to desire the functions, in order to participate in the government of the country, but also to get the incomes that were afferent to each function.

While the era is often called "feudal" in the Romanian historiography, there were some major differences between the status of the Western feudal lords and the status of the Romanian boyars. While a hierarchy existed in Wallachia and Moldavia just like in the West, the power balance was tilted towards the Hospodar, who had everyone as subjects and who had the power to demote even the richest boyar, to confiscate his wealth or even behead him. However, the power for the election of the hospodar was held by the great boyar families, who would form groups and alliances, often leading to disorder and instability.

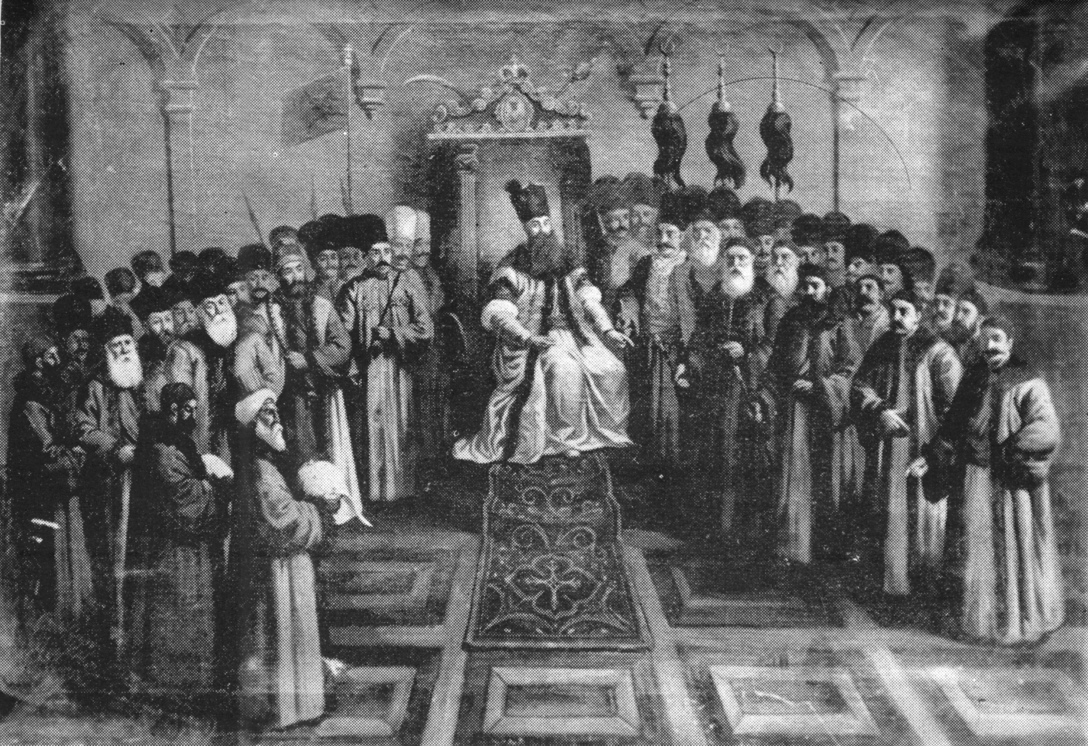
Hospodar Nicholas Mavrogenes and the boyar council

=== Phanariote era ===
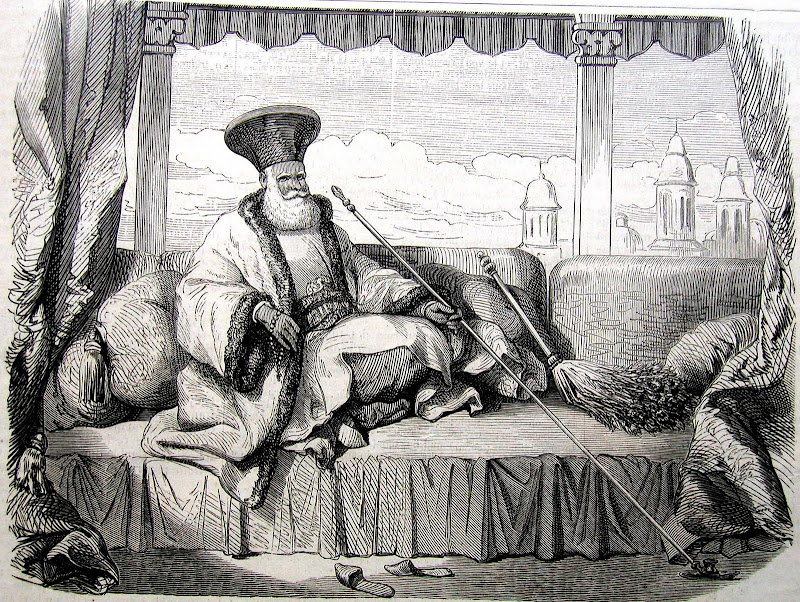
Boyar Iordache Filipescu, dressed in the Phanariote boyar fashion, sitting on a divan

After the Phanariote regime was instated in Moldavia (1711) and Wallachia (1716), many of the boyar class was made out of Constantinople Greeks who belonged to the Phanariote clients, who became officials and were assimilated to the boyar class or locals who bought their titles. When coming to Bucharest or Iași, the new Phanariote Hospodars came with a Greek retinue who were given the most important official jobs; many of these Greeks married into local boyar families. In order to consolidate their position within the Wallachian and Moldavian boyar class, the officials were allowed to keep their boyar title after the end of their term.

The official functions, which traditionally were given for a year, were often bought with money as an investment, since the function would often give large incomes in return. While the official functions were often given to both Romanians and Greeks, there was an exception: throughout the Phanariote era, the treasurers were mostly local boyars because they were more competent in collecting taxes. When the descendants of a boyar were not able to obtain even the lowest function, they became "fallen boyars" (mazili), who nevertheless, kept some fiscal privileges.

Many of the newly bestowed local boyars were wealthy merchants who paid in order to become boyars, in some cases they were even forced by the Hospodar to become boyars (and thus pay the Hospodar a sum). The princely courts of Bucharest and Iași kept title registers, which included a list of all the boyars (known as Arhondologia). Since the Hospodar wanted to maximize his income, it was in his interest to create as many boyars as possible (and receive money from each), leading to an inflation in the number of boyars.

The economic basis of the boyar's class was land ownership: by the 18th century, more than half of the land of Wallachia and Moldavia being owned by them. For instance, according to the 1803 Moldavian census, out of the 1711 villages and market towns, the boyars owned 927 of them. The process that began during the feudal era, of boyars seizing properties from the free peasants, continued and accelerated during this period.

The boyars wore costumes similar to those of the Turkish nobility, with the difference that instead of the turban, most of them wore a very large işlic. Female members of the boyar class also wore Turkish inspired costume. Many boyars used large sums of money for conspicuous consumption, particularly luxurious clothing, but also carriages, jewelry and furniture. The luxury of the boyars' lives contrasted strongly not only with the squalor of the Romanian villages, but also with the general appearance of the capitals, this contrast striking the foreigners who visited the Principalities. In the first decade of the 19th-century, female members of the boyar class started to adopt Western fashion: in July 1806, the wife of the Hospodar in Iași, Safta Ypsilanti, received the wife of the French consul dressed according to the French fashion. Male boyars, however, did not reform their costume to Western fashion until around the 1840s.

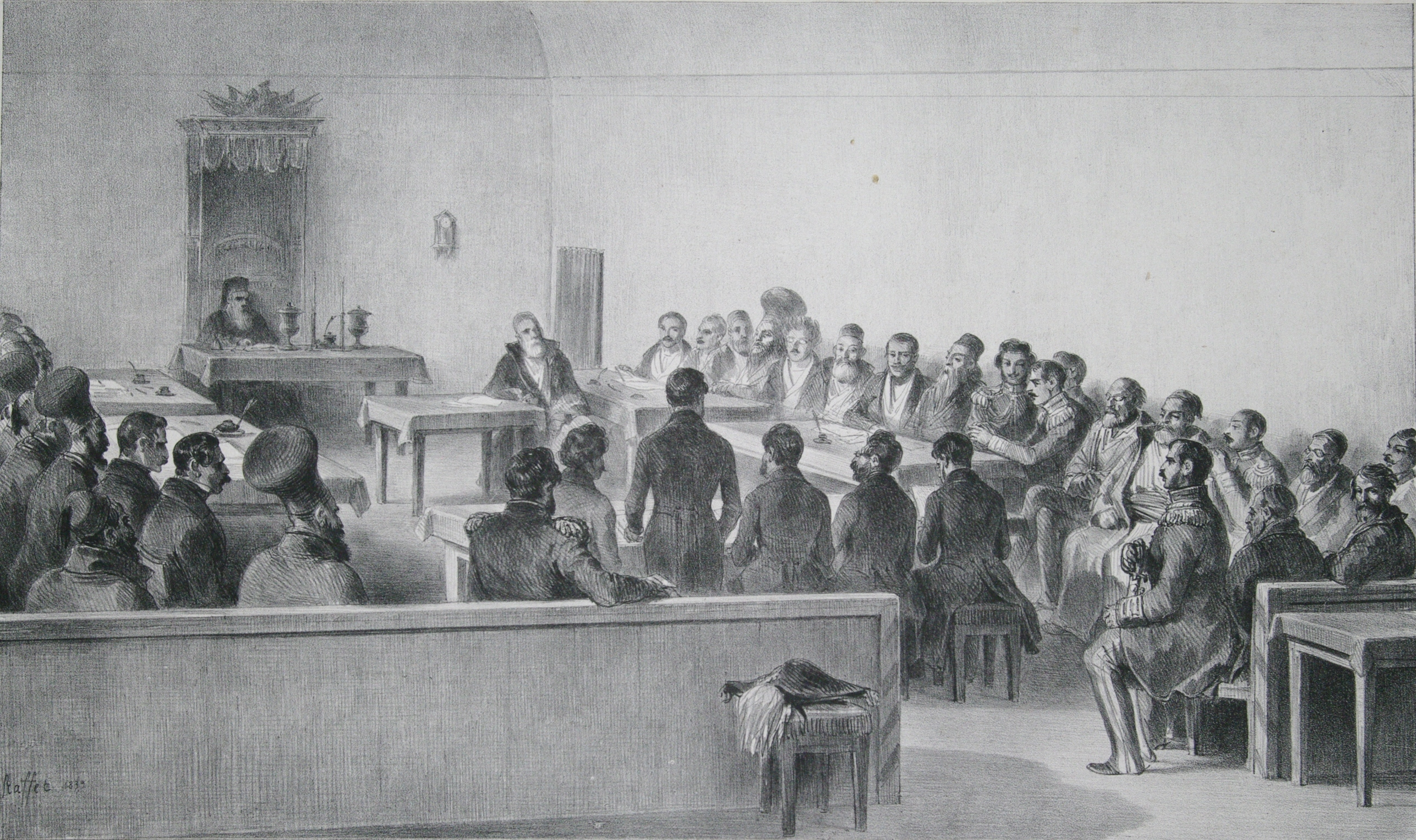
The Public assembly of Boyars, 1837

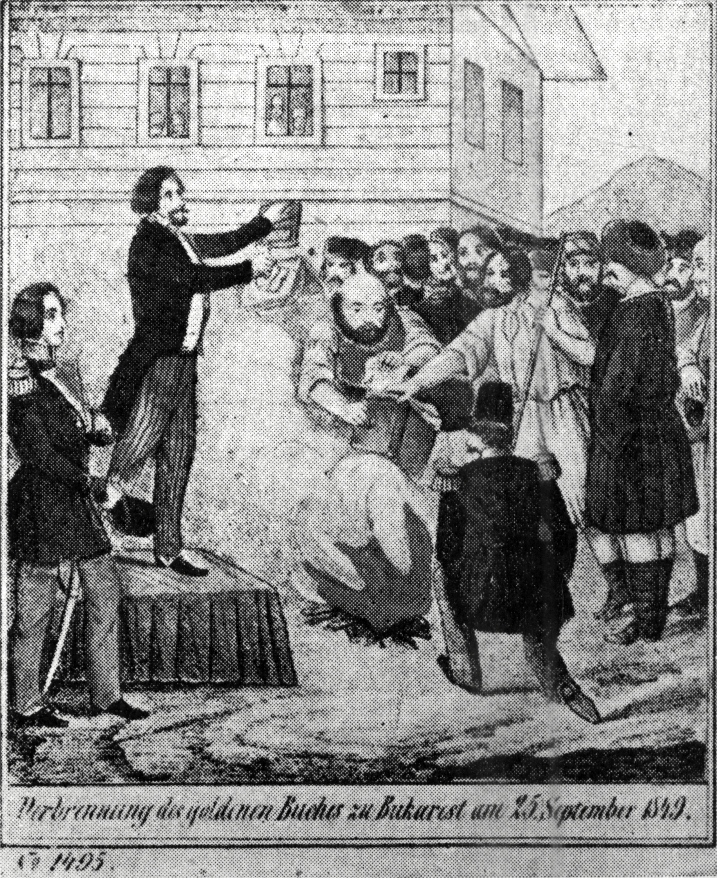
The burning of Regulamentul Organic and of the register of boyar ranks during the 1848 revolution

The opening towards Western Europe meant that the boyars adopted the Western mores and the luxury expenses increased.

Many greater boyars were able to afford these expenses through the intensification of the exploitation of their domains (and the peasants working on them).

Unlike them, many smaller boyars were not able to afford these expenses and were ruined by them.

=== Modern Romania ===
Starting with the middle of the 19th century, the word "boyar" began to lose its meaning as a "noble" and to mean simply "large landowner". Cuza's Constitution (known as the Statut) of 1864 deprived the boyars from the legal privileges and the ranks officially disappeared, but, through their wealth, they retained their economic and political influence, particularly through the electoral system of census suffrage. Some of the lower boyars joined the bourgeoisie involved in commerce and industry.

A number of 2000 large landowners held over 3 million hectares or about 38% of all arable land. Most of these boyars no longer took any part in managing their estates, but rather lived in Bucharest or in Western Europe (particularly France, Italy and Switzerland). They leased their estates for a fixed sum to arendași (leaseholders). Many of the boyars found themselves in financial difficulties; many of their estates had been mortgaged. The lack of interest in agriculture and their domains led to a dissolution of the boyar class.

== Organization and Ranks ==
Boyar Costumes, 1825
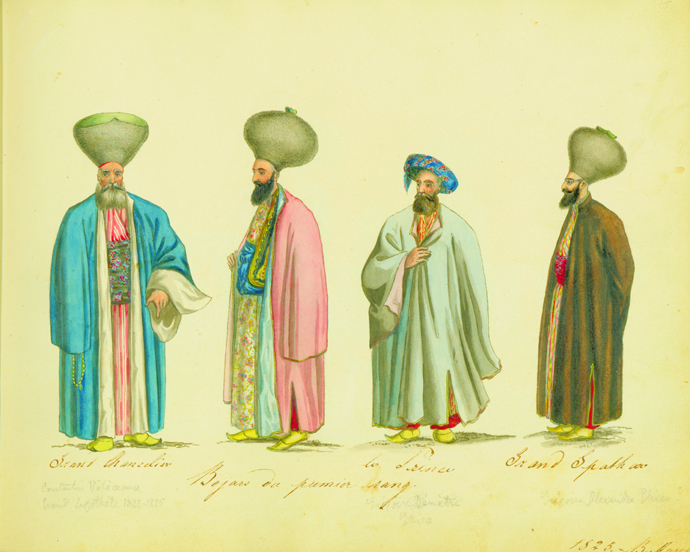
Boyars of the first rank (Great Boyars)

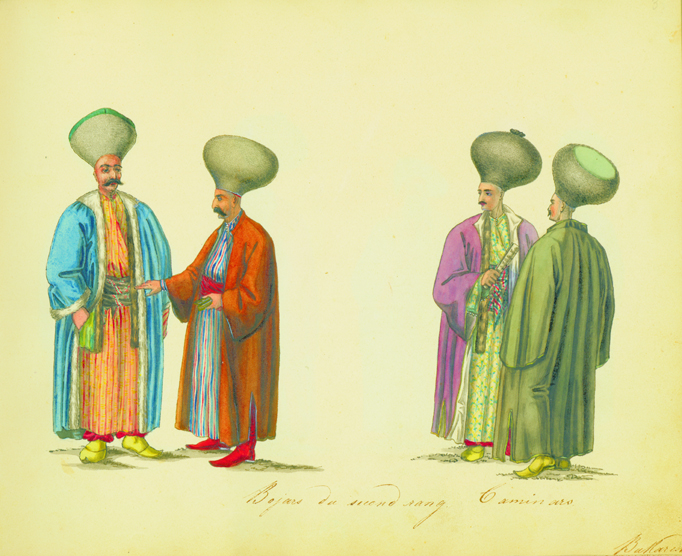
Boyars of the second rank

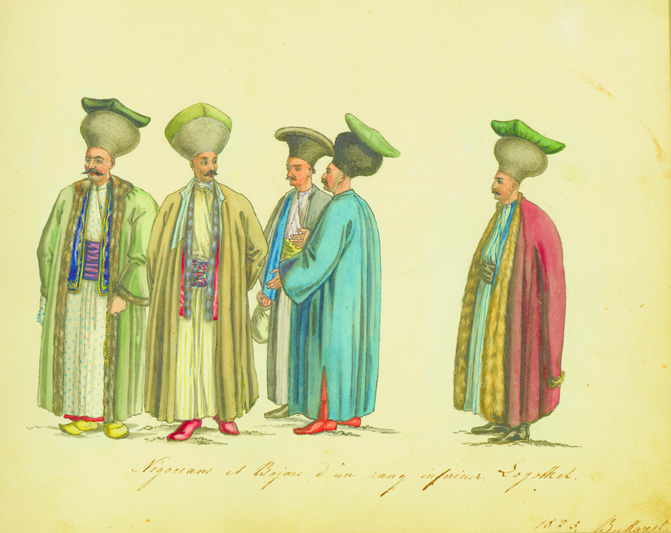
Boyars of the third rank

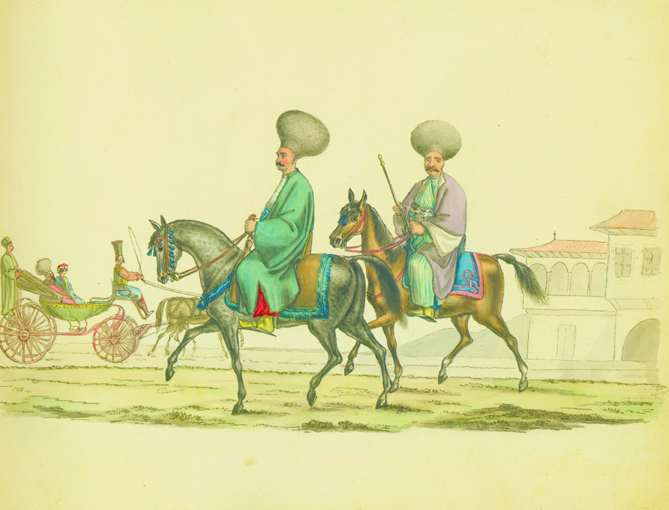
Phanariot Boyars on horseback and a carriage of first rank Boyars

The Boyars of Wallachia and Moldavia were divided into three primary classes, the most prestigious of which was the first rank. Vitally important to boyar identity and class stratification was costume. Boyars wore richly embroidered and expensive oriental costumes with many expensive furs, complemented by tall işlic hats of varying sizes and shapes. The quality, type, and color of material used in boyar costumes and headwear was indicative of one's rank in the social hierarchy. Members of the first rank were called Great Boyars and occupied the most important posts of the Wallachian and Moldavian administrations, including the Great Ban and the Great Logofăt. Great Boyars were the only class entitled to wear beards, and wore sable gugiuman hats with red tops (white tops were reserved for the Prince). After reforms made by Prince Constantine Mavrocordatos, descendants of Great Boyars were known as neamuri and descendants of small boyars were known as mazili.

Boyars of the second rank, much more numerous than Great Boyars, occupied posts in the administration such as Clucer, Paharnic, and Stolnic. Second and third rank boyars were not entitled to having beards, but wore mustaches instead. Small boyars wore smaller işlic hats than those of Great Boyars, and third rank boyars often had their hats adorned with large square cushions. These hats were not made of sable felt, but rather polecat, marten, fox, or lamb. In 1829, Great Boyars, second rank boyars, and third rank boyars occupied 59, 612, and 562 named administrative posts in Wallachia, respectively.

Many boyar families did not originate in Romania and came to the Danubian Principalities as retainers of the Phanariots. These families are identified by some scholars as Greco-Levantine owing to the varied ethnic origins of the families (including Greek, Venetian Slav, Albanian, and Bulgarian) and their self-identification and religious and cultural association with the Fanar, and their preference for speaking Greek. Tensions frequently mounted between native boyars and their Greek counterparts, but the ethnic admixture of both groups was complex. Many boyar families considered native had Greek or distant Greek origins, such as the Cantacuzino family, and both groups were primarily Grecophone. In 1821, native Wallachian families were among the many boyars of the so-called 'Greek party' who went into exile in Kronstadt. Conversely, many families which constituted the 'native' boyar nobility that remained in Wallachia were of Greco-Levantine descent.

== Legacy ==
The movement surrounding the Sămănătorul magazine lamented the disappearance of the boyar class, while not arguing for their return. Historian Nicolae Iorga saw the system not as a selfish exploitation of the peasants by the boyars, but rather as a rudimentary democracy. On the other side of the political spectrum, Marxist thinker Constantin Dobrogeanu-Gherea thought that the reforms didn't go far enough, arguing that the condition of the peasants was a neo-serfdom.
