= Gugiuman =

High-crowned cap

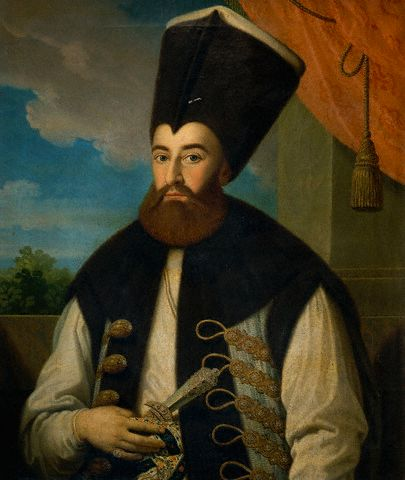
Grigore IV Ghica wearing the princely white-topped gugiuman

The gugiuman is a type of high-crowned cap that was worn by Hospodars of Wallachia and Moldavia and highest ranked boyars of both principalities into the first half of the nineteenth century. Gugiumans were made of sable fur and were exclusively reserved for the two aforementioned groups of nobles. The color of the felt atop of the hat (white for the Prince and red for Great Boyars) indicated the wearer's social status. Following the adoption of the Regulamentul Organic in the early 1830s, ruling princes adopted new, Russian-inspired military uniforms but retained the use of the white-topped gugiuman.

== See also ==
- List of hat styles
- Işlic
- Kalpak
