= Bashlyk =

Traditional headgear

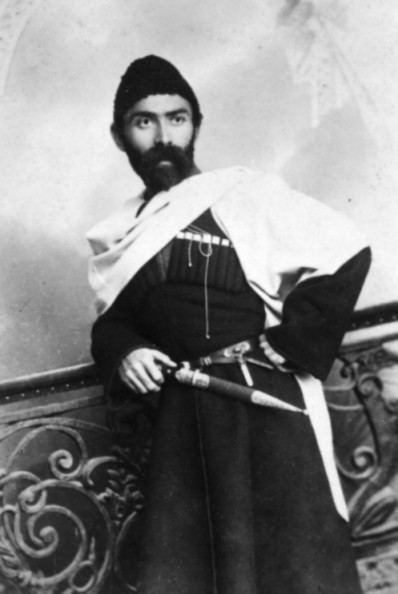
Ossetian poet Kosta Khetagurov wearing a bashlyk (white) taken off

A bashlyk, also spelled as Bashlik or Başlık (Turkish: head-ware) (Note: Azerbaijani: Başlıq, Karachay-Balkar: Başlıq, Adyghe: Shkharkhon, Abkhaz: qtarpá, Chechen: Ċukkuiy, Georgian: ყაბალახი, q'abalakhi, Ossetian: басылыхъхъ, basylyqq, Crimean Tatar: Başlıq, Tatar: Başlıq, Turkish: Başlık; "baş" - head, "-lıq" (Tatar) / "-lık" (Turkish) - derivative suffix.) is a traditional cone-shaped hooded headdress, usually of leather, felt or wool, featuring a round topped bonnet with lappets for wrapping around the neck. It is usually worn by Turks, Caucasian, Turkic and Cossack people. Local versions determine the trim, which may consist of decorative cords, embroidery, jewelry, metallized strings, fur balls or tassels. Among dozens of versions are winter bashlyks worn atop regular headdress, cotton bashlyks, homeknitted bashlyks, silk bashlyks, scarf bashlyks, down bashlyks, dress bashlyks, jumpsuit-type bashlyks, etc. Bashlyks are used as traditional folk garment, and as uniform headdress.

== History ==
Bashlyks became fashionable in Russia in 1830-1840, after the Napoleonic Wars with significant participation of the Bashkir cavalry. By the 1862 bashlyks were made a uniform headdress in Cossack armies, and later in other branches of Russian armed forces. The military bashlyk was bright yellow camel wool, with a yellow band. Officer bashlyks had gold or silver band. In the Russian army, bashlyks lasted till 1917, when they became a trademark of White Army officers and Red Army cavalry.

== Gallery ==
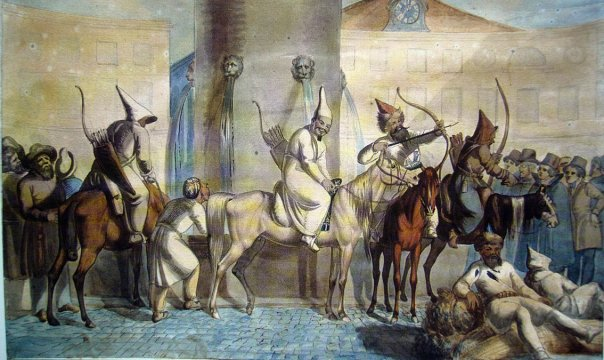
19th century depiction of Bashkirs raiding Paris, all depicted wearing Bashlyks and Malahais

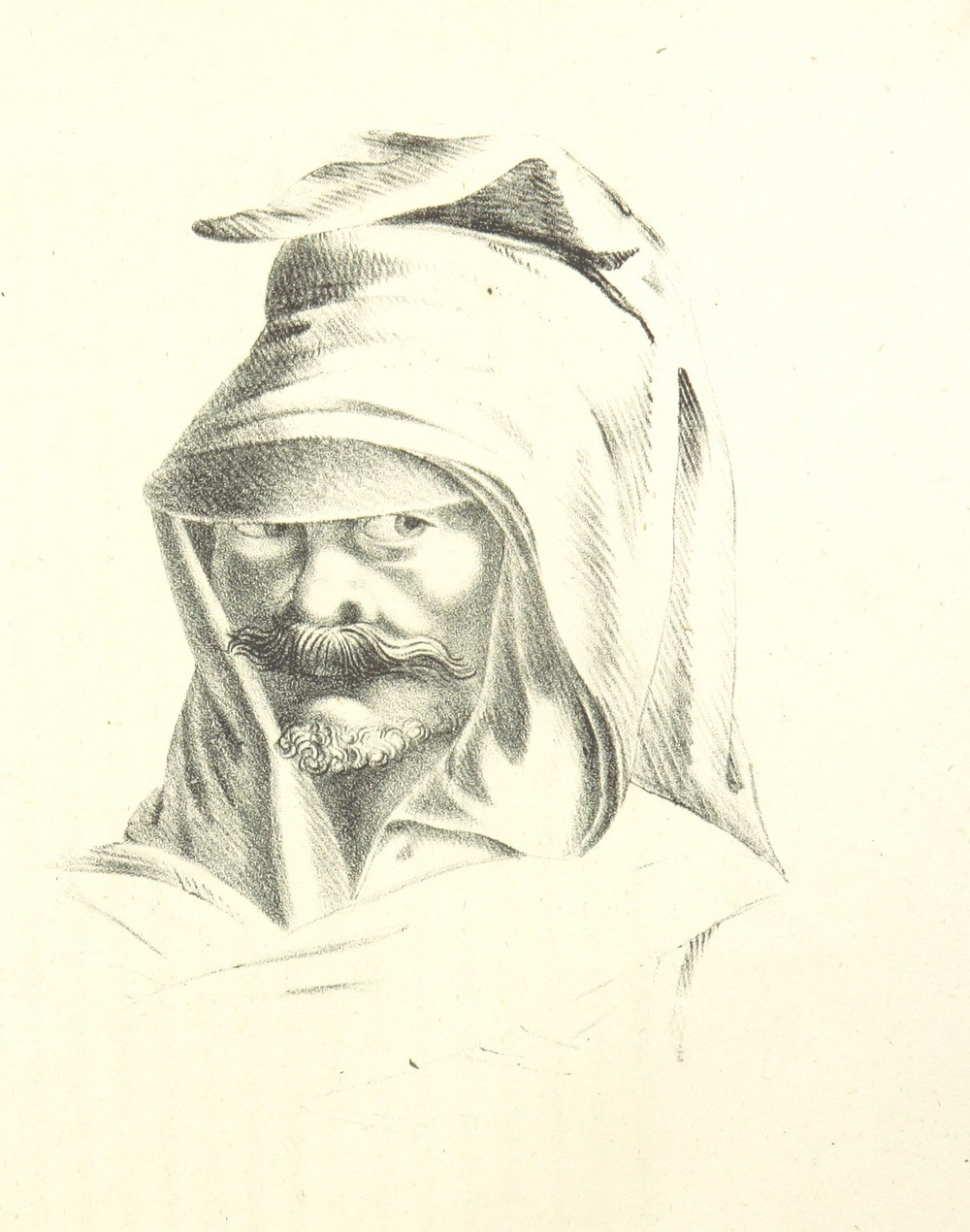
A sketch of a Don Cossack with a bashlyk on, taken in Paris during the campaign of 1815

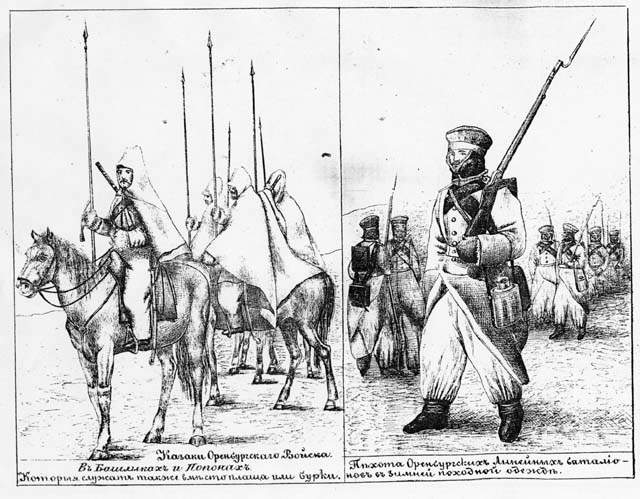
An 1839 drawing of Orenburg Cossacks wearing bashlyks (left)

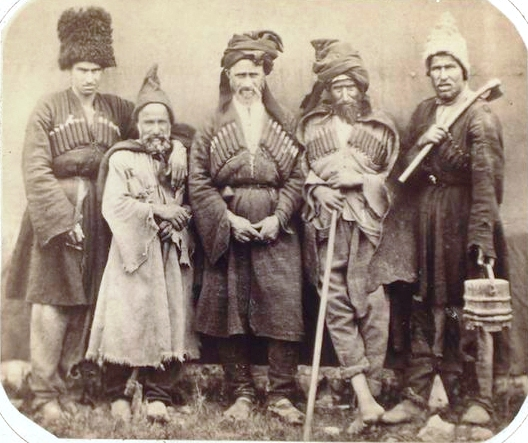
An 1865 photograph of Jigets wearing Bashlyks and Kalpaks

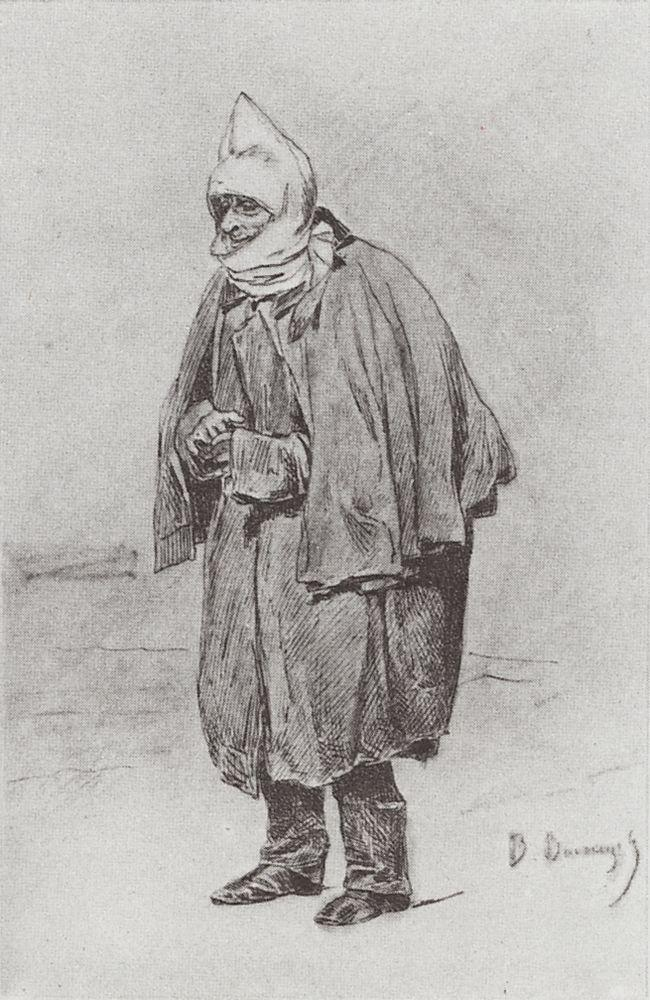
A 1871 sketch of an old man in a Bashlyk by Apollinary Vasnetsov

== See also ==
- List of hat styles
- Malahai
- Budenovka
- Kalpak
- Kausia
- Phrygian cap
