= Serfdom in Moldavia and Wallachia =

Status of peasants under feudalism in Moldavia and Wallachia

Serfdom was widespread in Moldavia and Wallachia between 15th and 18th centuries, replacing the obște (autonomous communities) which were common before the founding of the medieval states of Wallachia and Moldavia. Initially, the serfs were allowed to change the estate on which they lived (sometimes in exchange for a sum of money paid to the boyar), although restrictions were introduced over the decades.

== Names ==
A generic name for serfs was șerb (from Latin servus, "slave", cognate with serf), but they also had some regional names: vecini in Moldavia (in today's language meaning "neighbour") and rumâni in Wallachia. The latter was actually the native ethnonym of Romanians; Neagu Djuvara explains it by the fact that in the Middle Ages, the landlords may have been foreign, Slavic or Cuman.

== History ==
=== Origins ===
Originally, Romanians lived in autonomous communities called "obște", which mixed private and common ownership, employing an open field system. With time, in the 14th and 15th centuries, the private ownership of land gained ground, leading to differences within the obște, towards a stratification of the members of the community.

Some villages were given by the hospodar to boyars, military servants and monasteries, replacing the common ownership with the ownership of a feudal lord. Other villages were taken over by force by military leaders without the involvement of the Hospodar.

In 15th century Moldavia, the organization of the villages from free obște (being led by a cneaz) continued to exist in parallel with the feudal order.

=== Michael's bond ===
Michael's bond was a decree enacted by Michael the Brave that bonded the Wallachian serfs to the estate where they were living at that time. This made these serfs (and potentially others) connected to the land no matter where they moved to and thereby ruled and "owned" by whoever owned the estate. While this did not likely introduce or strengthen serfdom in the area, the tax increases did likely lead to more serfs as peasants fell to these taxes and then serfdom. This subject is the matter of debate.

=== Ending ===
The life and status of serfs gradually worsened during the 18th century. There were cases in which serfs were sold individually by their landlords, breaking them from the land which they worked or even their family. The peasants complained to the Hospodar that they no longer were treated like serfs, but more like slaves.

Some serfs fled their estates to other ones which were sufficiently far away that their previous landlord could not find them. As there was always a need for more manpower, the new landlord usually accepted the stray serfs without questioning their origin. In the aftermath of the Austro-Russian–Turkish War (1735–39), the harsh conditions of the serfs led to depopulation of entire villages or even regions, as serfs fled towards other places, often in the mountains or even in Transylvania. The landlords saw that without a workforce, they could lose everything, so some released their serfs, allowing them to work their land as before, but as free peasants in exchange of a rent. Special contracts were used to induce fleeing peasants to return, and Transylvanians were encouraged to settle down.

The abolishment of serfdom was made by Constantine Mavrocordatos, who ruled successively Wallachia and Moldavia, following the consultation of the boyars' councils in order to standardize the conditions of the peasants and to stop the resistance movement of the peasants. The abolishment was enacted on August 5, 1746 in Wallachia and August 6, 1749 in Moldavia.

Following the abolishment, Wallachia and Moldavia witnessed a flow of immigrants from Transylvania, which still had serfdom.

== See also ==
- Boyars of Moldavia and Wallachia
- Slavery in Romania
