= Ioan C. Filitti =

Romanian historian and diplomat

Ioan Constantin Filitti
- Filitti, ca. 1913
- Born: May 8, 1879; Bucharest
- Died: September 21, 1945 (aged 66)
- Other names: Ion C. Filitti, Jean C. Filitti, F. K.

Academic background
- Influences: Edmund Burke, Petre P. Carp, Titu Maiorescu, Ernest Renan, Hippolyte Taine

Academic work
- Era: 20th century
- School or tradition: Conservatism, Junimea
- Main interests: social history, genealogy, heraldry, legal history, political history
- Notable works: Din arhivele Vaticanului (1913–1914); Domniile române sub Regulamentul Organic (1915); Arhiva Gheorghe Grigore Cantacuzino (1919); Pagini din istoria României moderne (1935); Conservatori și junimiști în viața politică românească (1936)
- Influenced: P. P. Panaitescu

Ioan Constantin Filitti (Romanian pronunciation: [iˈo̯aŋ konstanˈtin fiˈliti]; first name also Ion; Francized Jean C. Filitti; May 8, 1879 – September 21, 1945) was a Romanian historian, diplomat and conservative theorist, best remembered for his contribution to social history, legal history, genealogy and heraldry. A member of the Conservative Party and an assistant of its senior leader Titu Maiorescu, he had aristocratic (boyar) origins and an elitist perspective. Among his diverse contributions, several focus on 19th-century modernization under the Regulamentul Organic regime, during which Romania was ruled upon by the Russian Empire. As a historian, Filitti is noted for his perfectionism, and for constantly revising his own works.

I. C. Filitti had an auspicious debut in diplomacy and politics, but his career was mired in controversy. A "Germanophile" by the start of World War I, he secretly opposed the pact between Romania and the Entente Powers, and opted to stay behind in German-occupied territory. He fell into disgrace for serving the collaborationist Lupu Kostaki as Prefect and head of the National Theatre, although he eventually managed to overturn his death sentence for treason. Filitti became a recluse, focusing on his scholarship and press polemics, but was allowed to serve on the Legislative Council after 1926.

In his political tracts, written well after the Conservative Party's demise, I. C. Filitti preserves the orthodox conservative principles of Maiorescu. His attachment to boyar tradition was expanded into a critique of centralized government, etatism and Romanian liberalism. Toward the end of his life, he supported the dictatorial regime known as National Renaissance Front.

== Biography ==
=== Origin and early life ===
Through his paternal family, Filitti descended from historical figures whose careers were intertwined with the history of Wallachia, the Romanian subregion and former autonomous state. It originated with ethnic Greek migrants from the Epirus—where the Filitti family was known to be residing in the 17th century. The main settlers were male monks, whose presence was attested in Buzău County around 1786: rising through the ranks of the Romanian Orthodox Church, Dositei Filitti served as Wallachian Metropolitan Bishop, assigning nephew Constandie to preside over the Diocese of Buzău. Although his Epirote father was a noted Russophile, the Metropolitan regarded himself as a liberal-minded Wallachian patriot: he founded the local school of divinity, provided scholarships to young Wallachians, and sponsored the growing printing industry. In tandem, he spoke out against the practice of slavery, protecting Romani women from their Wallachian masters and donating money for the release of devșirme victims. During times of turmoil, when Wallachia effectively became a dominion of the Russian Empire, Dositei was swiftly deposed on Russian orders.

The historian claimed lineage from the non-monastic branch of the Filitti clan. A Silvestru Filitti, active ca. 1810, was among the first private practitioners in Wallachia. Fully Romanianized, 20th-century Filittis were still members of Romania's privileged class. A native of Bucharest, Ioan C. was the son of Colonel Constantin Filitti, a former Ordinance Officer of the Romanian Domnitori. By then, the family owned a country estate, at Alexeni, Ialomița County. The Filittis preserved strong connections with the Ialomița region, where Colonel Filitti had twice served as Prefect. Ioan inherited from him a deep dislike and mistrust toward the dominant National Liberal Party (PNL), sentiments which carried him into Conservative politics: Constantin regarded himself as a political victim of the PNL establishment, and in particular of the Brătianu family. Colonel Filitti had another son, Alexandru—better known under the moniker Filitti-Robănești.

Filitti family coat of arms

The mother, Elena, was born into the Ghica family. Her father, Mihail Ghica, was a staff officer of the Royal Army, who had been married for a while to writer Elena Văcărescu. Thorough his mother's other relatives, Ioan also descended from the eponymous boyar line of Slatina (the Slătineanus).

I. C. Filitti studied at Saint Sava National College, where he was colleagues with future politician (and adversary) Ion G. Duca. He was an eminent student, who earned top distinctions annually, and moved on to study at the École Libre des Sciences Politiques in Paris. His first ever published work as a historian was a French-language tome, Le Rôle diplomatique des phanariotes de 1700 à 1821 ("The Diplomatic Role of Phanariotes from 1700 to 1821"). Signed Jean C. Filitti, it was probably his licence ès lettres, and, although receiving good reviews, was never listed by its author in his official résumés. He became a Doctor of Law in 1904, when he published the first draft of his study about Regulamentul Organic as the first ever Romanian constitution.

=== Entry into public life ===
Young Filitti made a remarkably early entry into the diplomatic corps, and stayed on with the Romanian Legation in France. In this capacity, he purposefully embarrassed PNL Foreign Minister Ion I. C. Brătianu by not sending in all Legation employees to receive him during an official visit. During his return trips to Romania, Filitti was focusing on researching his own family archives, and, in 1910, published the volume Așezământul cultural al mitropolitului Dosit[h]ei Filitti, de la înființare până azi ("Metropolitan Dosit[h]ei Filitti's Cultural Foundation, from Its Establishment to the Present Day"). In researching this work, Filitti sought input from the genealogical school in Greece and Macedonia, and from Romanian diplomats working in Istanbul. In a show of perfectionism, Filitti constantly revised the work as new data surfaced, and, in 1936, declared the 1910 edition to be entirely unusable.

Filitti was soon drawn into the Conservative establishment, by politics and family connections. His wife Alexandrina ("Sanda"), descending from another branch of the Ghica clan, was a distant relative of two Conservative potentates and doyens of the Cantacuzino political family: Gheorghe Grigore Cantacuzino-Nababul, who was twice the Prime Minister of Romania, and newspaper magnate Grigore Gh. Cantacuzino. She brought in considerable wealth. Filitti was by then also in contact with Junimea, an inner-Conservative club dedicated to cultural criticism, presided upon by the aged literary patron Titu Maiorescu. As noted in 2008 by political scientist Ioan Stanomir, the young diplomat was "an orthodox Junimist who survived the end of his world." Like other historiographers and doctrinaires raised by Junimea, Filitti the scholar firmly believed in the preservation of boyar demesnes and, as political scientist Victor Rizescu suggests, took part in the century-long debate opposing elitist historians to the advocates of natural law.

Filitti's biographer and posthumous daughter-in-law, Georgeta Penelea-Filitti, also writes that, even in the 1910s, he had become a Conservative apologist, who felt compelled to justify the party line in a "trenchant and unresponsive" manner. Like senior Junimists Maiorescu and Petre P. Carp, Filitti reserved contempt for Take Ionescu, the rising star of Romanian conservatism, whom he depicted as a manipulator with no actual convictions.

Filitti's first important postings were received from the Conservative cabinet of P. P. Carp, wherein Titu Maiorescu held the Foreign Affairs portfolio. After 1910, Maiorescu appointed Filitti head of the Ministry's Political Section in Bucharest, and then granted him supervision of the Consular and Litigation sections. Filitti was also sent on regular missions to France, Austria-Hungary, the Ottoman Empire, Serbia and Italy. The missions allowed Filitti to expand his activity as a historiographer and archivist. The main stimulus of this activity was, according to Filitti's son Manole, a sense of filial duty: "since destiny wished for his parents to have such assets as would allow him to study in Paris for a couple of years, [my father] felt compelled to repay them by publishing works which would live up to that degree of education." According to historian Lucian Boia, although "non-academic", Filitti's work has earned deserved praise from within the scholarly community. Georgeta Penelea-Filitti argues that I. C. Filitti's work, indicative of his personality, covers an impressively "large horizon."

On May 8, 1913, shortly before the Second Balkan War, Filitti began keeping a diary, which records the political intrigues of his age, and offers insight into Conservative affairs. One of the first events recorded there is the August 1913 Peace Conference of Bucharest. Filitti was the official Secretary during the proceedings. In this context, he also helped Titu Maiorescu with drafting Cartea Verde ("The Green Book"), that is the official justification of Romanian foreign policy. Decades later, he recalled that the congress had been a magnificent affair, noting especially the triumphant arrival of King Carol I, that "old Nestor of European monarchs". The Conference, he recalled, "was the swan song of the old Conservative Party."

His services during the Conference earned him public praise from Maiorescu, and Filitti, who feared for his prospects, was kept on at the Ministry even after the National Liberal Emanoil Porumbaru became Minister in January 1914. In tandem with his diplomatic endeavors, he spent time researching at the Vatican Library in Rome. As noted by Manole Filitti, Ioan C. received "special recommendations", which allowed him entry into the less accessible archives of the Holy See. Such study trips resulted in a two-volume anthology of historical sources, Din arhivele Vaticanului ("From the Vatican Archives", 1913 and 1914).

=== Germanophile polemicist and Domniile române... ===
World War I was a turning point in Filitti's diplomatic career. Like many of his fellow Conservatives, and against the lobby which dominated the PNL, he believed in tying Romania to the Central Powers, especially to the German Empire and Austria-Hungary. The Entente Powers alternative, he argued, was bankrupt, because Romania would find herself manipulated by a hostile Russian Empire. His core idea, paraphrased by Georgeta Filitti, was that: "Any entente, any attempt to collaborate, any concession made to [Russia] would sooner or later turn against us." The diplomat witnessed with alarm that public opinion was against him, either because of seductive Francophilia, or because a war on Austria-Hungary could bring Romania Transylvania region and other irredenta: "The Russian gold has bought off the press and many private persons. Others are guided by sentimentality". In restaurants such as Casa Capșa, "Franco-hysteria and Russo-Frenchitude [have reached] a peak", and "people of no significance" were even proposing to assassinate the Germanophile King Carol. In this context, he believed, Transylvania could only stand to lose its character if ever governed from Bucharest.

At around that time, Filitti issued at his expense the Germanophile brochure Cu Tripla Alianță ("With the Triple Alliance"). He prudently signed it with the fake initials F. K. In it, Filitti spoke out at length about containing Pan-Slavism, more important a priority than "the nation's other aspirations" (in Transylvania): "The best thing one may wish upon Romania is that the Muscovite Empire be evicted as far away as possible from the heart of Europe." The pamphlet was also noted for its unfulfilled prophecy that Italy would also join the war as a German ally, and for arguing that, either way, Austria-Hungary was set to collapse after the war. The text's reception, he noted, was disastrous: no reviews were printed, almost no bookstores would sell it, and the few who looked over it attributed it to an agent of influence or to some "paid-off Jew". In Cu Tripla Alianță and in his diary, the diplomat continued to complain that the Francophile mood was irrational, since France and the Entente as a whole only "love [Romanians] when they need us", which was "only natural". In the same vein, his diary documents earlier instances where (he argued) France had gambled with Romania's independence.

In his more public existence, I. C. Filitti was still regarded with sympathy by the entire political and cultural establishment. In 1915, he was elected a corresponding member of the Romanian Academy. The institution also granted him its prestigious Năsturel Herescu Award. This was in recognition of his groundbreaking monograph on modernization under the Regulamentul regime: Domniile române sub Regulamentul Organic ("Romanian Reigns under Regulamentul Organic"). It described in some detail the culture shock of the 1830s, when the Westernized elites reversed a process of Turkification, and noted the ambivalent policies of Russian governors. The book also speaks about the 1832 manhunt for, and forced sedentarization of, Wallachia's Romani people, both the fugitive slaves and the free nomads.

Domniile române... was simultaneously published in Bucharest (by Editura Socec), Leipzig (Otto Harrassowitz) and Vienna (Carl Gerold). It was then reprinted by the official Editura Academiei press, under the supervision of historian Nicolae Iorga. The encounter was confrontational: Iorga decided to cut out entire passages where, he argued, the author had gone into too much detail. The intervention was unwittingly destructive, as part of the documents cited by Filitti, and only by him, have since been destroyed.

It was also in 1915 that Filitti contributed his views on the thorny issue of "Capitulations", contracts reputedly signed by two Danubian Principalities (Wallachia and Moldavia) when they first came under the Ottoman Empire's suzerainty. The author postulated that the Capitulations regulated the status of foreigners living in ancient Romania, exempting them from the consequences of common law, and creating major legal problems after 1800. His research produced the article România față de capitulațiile Turciei ("Romania in Relation to the Turkish Capitulations"), taken up by the Academy's official yearbook. It saw print at the same time as his new collection of documents, sampling the archives of French Ambassadors to the Porte: Lettres et extraits concernant les relations des principautés roumaines avec la France, 1728-1810 ("Letters and Excerpts on the Relations between the Romanian Principalities and France").

=== Filitti and the Kostaki administration ===
I. C. Filitti was not in a celebratory mood as the National Liberals publicized their August 1916 Treaty, when Romania became part of the Entente. His diaries record not only his general frustration, but also his belief that the decades of PNL rule had left the military ill-prepared, and claims about generalized embezzlement within the Army. He was soon after drafted into the Romanian Land Forces, as officer of the Second Field Army, and stationed in Bucharest. When the German-led counteroffensive forced the army on the retreat, resulting in the Central Powers' occupation of southern Romania, Filitti took his most controversial decision. In circumstances that are largely unknown, he opted to stay behind in occupied territory, and greeted the enemy. According to Boia, Filitti received two contradictory orders: one to follow the Imperial Russian Army as liaison officer, the other to stay behind in Bucharest; he conveniently opted to follow the latter.

The Filitti family had by then divided its loyalties: judge Ioan D. Filitti, formerly a PNL politico, followed the Germanophile line; instead, Ioan C.'s own brother Alexandru entered history when he led a cavalry charge on a German machine gun turret, located outside of Balș.

At the time, Lupu Kostaki was organizing left-behind Conservatives and forming a provisional administration, answering to the German command. Filitti served Kostaki as Head of the National Theatre Bucharest. Under his management, the Theater took on some 67 new productions of Romanian plays. The Germans also assigned him to an administrative position, making him the Prefect of Ialomița County. However, Filitti himself was troubled by his association with the puppet regime. According to Georgeta Filitti, the diary he kept shows "the efforts to interpose himself between the foreign military authorities and his own administrators, to alleviate the unbearable regime of requisitions, the abuse and Prussian arrogance, [efforts which] were, for the most part, ineffectual." Like other Germanophiles, Filitti justified himself as a protector of Romanian interests during times of chaos, and was discouraged to find out that the German regime regarded him as a servant. He had similar trouble getting along with some of his Romanian colleagues, in particular Virgil Arion, the phantom Minister of Education (whom he described as nepotistic, aloof, and especially "lazy").

Both of his assignments failed to satisfy him: he was, according to Boia, a "strange" choice for the Theater leadership, and gave up on this office in April 1917; Filitti himself viewed his Prefect's job as inane, and repeatedly presented his resignation (only accepted in February 1918). His departure from the Theater was in fact hastened by the Germans, who took over the location for their own purposes. Filitti informed the troupe members that they had to pay rent, and they moved out in protest. While in Ialomița, Filitti combined his administrative missions (retold as short notes in his diaries) with historical research, and tapped into a documentary fund at Alexeni. Although only a junior member of the administrative staff, Filitti aimed for a position at the core of government, and demanded from Kostaki a post better suited to his intelligence, "in Bucharest". He noted that the death of Maiorescu in June 1917 had stripped him of political support inside the Conservative Party, and had derailed his steady advancement.

Meanwhile, the legitimate government had relocated to Iași, in besieged Moldavia. Late in 1916, it court-martialled Filitti in absentia, and sentenced him to death for the crime of high treason. By January 1918, the collapse of Russian forces on the Eastern Front led the Iași administration into negotiating a separate peace with the Central Powers. Germanophile Alexandru Marghiloman took over as Premier, in what seemed to spell a moral victory for the pro-German camp. However, Filitti was drawing closer to the more disgruntled Germanophiles, led by P. P. Carp, who wanted to sign peace on their own terms: "I ask Carp, should he leave to negotiate for Romania, to take me with him. He says that he'll take along his son. I note that one does not exclude the other. He agrees" (January 12, 1918). Filitti was also upset that Marghiloman himself had not yet offered him a high diplomatic post during negotiations over the Buftea-Bucharest Peace Treaty, and noted that the Ententist King, Ferdinand I, "made it hard" for him to be accepted back into the diplomatic corps. As noted by Georgeta Filitti, Ferdinand vetoed successive proposals to rehire him as public servant.

In June 1918, I. C. Filitti handed himself in to the authorities in Moldavia, and, upon retrial, was acquitted of treason. In addition to presenting evidence of his efforts to curb German excesses, he enlisted the testimony of Ialomița citizens, who vouched for him. However, Boia concludes, the retrial itself was a sham: "A rehabilitation as politicized in the new context as had been his sentencing at the end of 1916."

=== Post-1918 controversy ===
Upon the end of 1918, when the Central Powers succumbed on the Western Front, the pro-Entente forces regained power. I. C. Filitti faced the political repercussions: blocked out of the Foreign Ministry and diplomatic corps, he had to reinvent himself as a full-time historian, publicist and essayist. He largely immersed himself in his decades-long work, in effect a multilevel historical narrative covering the history of the Danubian Principalities, from the foundation of Wallachia (14th century) to the emergence of United Romania (1859). Much of his interest, marked by what Georgeta Filitti calls "excessive accuracy", was in reviewing the intricate boyar genealogies. He substantiated the various inheritance claims, and, in addition, painstakingly retraced the borders of Wallachia's oldest demesnes. During his retrial, facing the possibility of execution, Filitti also turned his attention to the philosophy of history, reading profusely from Ernest Renan and Hippolyte Taine.

According to Filitti, the war spelled out the end of Romania's aristocratic order, leaving the country prey to the nouveaux riches and the neo-Jacobins. As the Conservative Party itself collapsed into obscurity, he remained largely cut off from the outside world, and rejected many of the recent innovations. Reportedly, he wrote all his books and articles in dip pen, and never watched a motion picture. After 1919, he had to recover from financial ruin, having entrusted the bulk of his assets (what had not been lost in the war) to a broker, who gambled it away and then committed suicide.

Filitti lived secluded in a townhouse on Oltarului Street, in the Bucharest quarter of Moșilor. He repeatedly complained about street noises, confiscated the footballs of neighborhood children, and eventually received (from Romanian Police chief Gavrilă Marinescu) a permanent guard to protect him from distractions. Filitti had few visiting friends, among them Alexandru Filitti-Robănești, teacher Alexandru Pisoschi, historians Emanoil Hagi-Moscu and G. D. Florescu. He was however in constant correspondence with other scholars who shared his passions, including Greek jurist Panagiotis Zepos, His Majesty's Antiquarian G. T. Kirileanu, bibliophile Constantin Karadja, regional historian G. Poboran, academician-priest Nicolae M. Popescu and Hungarian archivist Endre (Andrei) Veress. In addition to the anti-Germanophile Nicolae Iorga, his rivals in academia included a new generation of leading historians, who were targets of his polemical articles: Gheorghe I. Brătianu, George Fotino, Constantin C. Giurescu and P. P. Panaitescu. The latter was however influenced by Filitti's ideas on the sources of landed property, and incorporated them into his own historical narrative.

An early product of Filitti's interest in genealogy was a 1919 book about his relatives, the Cantacuzinos: Arhiva Gheorghe Grigore Cantacuzino ("The Gheorghe Grigore Cantacuzino Archive"). It refers to the documents collected by Cantacuzino-Nababul, whom the book describes as: "Good and kind, a self-effacing host, confident of the nation's faculties." The author tracked down Nababul's origins to Michael "Șeytanoğlu" Kantakouzenos, a Byzantine Greek in Ottoman service, active around 1580. The factual errors of this study caused Filitti great distress, to the point where he planned to entirely revise his version of the Cantacuzino family tree. The book is still considered a particularly relevant source on the obscure genealogies of some high-ranking Greek-Romanian families: Cara(g)iani, Filodor, Gheraki and Plagino.

Filitti the politician returned in 1921 with an extended pro domo covering his wartime stances: Rusia, Austro-Ungaria și Germania față de România ("Russia, Austria-Hungary and Germany Confront Romania"). The same year, in May, Iași's Viața Românească review hosted his tract on administrative reform, whereby he criticized attempts to impose centralized government on post-war Greater Romania. He proposed three essential policies: decentralization, the depoliticization of public administration, and enhanced executive powers for the prefects. These prolonged P. P. Carp's ideas on local autonomy and, in addition, attempted to protect the existing local government of the newly united Transylvania, Bessarabia and Bukovina.

He still struggled with prejudice against Germanophiles: also in 1921, he tried to obtain the History Chair at the University of Iași, but lost once his old adversary Iorga intervened against him. Two years later, he was present at the funeral ceremony of Dimitrie Onciul, a fellow historian and Junimist. Onciul, whose Germanophila had been the topic of a major scandal in 1919, was honored by Filitti with a funeral oration. It stated: "All of us, we are what our known or unknown ancestors have accumulated in our beings; we are that which preceding generations have planted in us; we are the echo of our dead."

=== Recovery ===
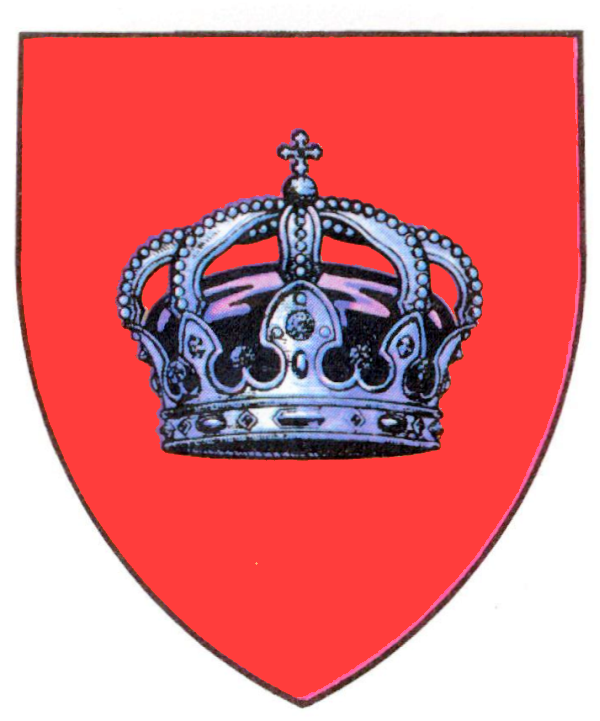
Brașov County coat of arms, as redesigned in the 1930s. Here, the Steel Crown replaces the earlier royal crown of Brassó County

In the early 1920s, I. C. Filitti worked with the formerly Junimist tribune Convorbiri Literare, which published fragments of his research on Maiorescu (1922) and novelist Costache Negruzzi (1923). Filitti subsequently turned his attention to some of the earliest sources on Wallachian history, adding his opinion to the debate surrounding the historicity of Negru Vodă (described by some early modern sources as Wallachia's state-builder). His topical study, published by in the 1924 Romanian Academy annals, concluded that Negru Vodă was in fact the stuff of legend, concocted by the 17th-century Wallachian Lord Matei Basarab. The next year, he returned to social history, with the book Clasele sociale în trecutul românesc ("Social Classes in the Romanian Past"). It mainly explained the difference between the concepts of nobility in Western Europe, on one hand, and the Danubian Principalities, on the other: Moldo-Wallachian nobility had no concept of knighthood, as all boyars were defined by their demesnes.

Eventually, in 1926, King Ferdinand allowed Filitti to resume his political career, making him a member of the Romanian Legislative Council. An emanation of the 1923 Constitution, it comprised experts tasked with reviewing laws endorsed by Parliament, and whose exact role sparked a series of controversies. Filitti was among those who described the Council as a necessary branch of the legislature, rather than as an organ of the executive.

Also in 1926, Filitti was one of the authors of a legal history overview, Contribuții la istoria justiției penale în Principatele române ("Contributions to the History of Penal Justice in the Romanian Principalities"). By means of Iorga's academic journal Revista Istorică, he also publicized his discovery of a 17th-century Romanian glossary, which emissaries of the Holy See used on their missions to the Danubian Principalities. He returned in 1927 with a work tracing the very history of the Legislative Council: Originea și menirea Consiliului Legislativ ("The Origin and Purpose of the Legislative Council").

Filitti ended the 13th and final notebook of his diary on March 6, 1928. By 1929, he turned his attention to the history of medicine in Wallachia, publishing a study of medical practice between 1784 and 1828. The same year, he edited the critical edition of the 1829 boyar register (catagrafie), originally compiled by Russian authorities under Regulamentul provisions. It notably showed the division of aristocracy into three classes, with only 70 entries in the top, "great boyars", category. Filitti demonstrated that, at only 4.6 ‰ of the Wallachian population, Wallachian boyars formed one of the thinnest layers of European aristocrats proportional to the respective population.

While still involved in the disputes over Legislative Council attributions, Filitti was a member, and later President, of the state's Heraldry and Genealogy Commission. The appointment again brought him into disagreement with the Romanian monarch, this time involving the heraldic symbols of Greater Romania. Filitti and Kirileanu suggested redesigned coats of arms of the Romanian counties, each bearing the Steel Crown, as a show of national unity; Ferdinand disagreed, and the counties were only allowed their simple escutcheons. He was turning his attention to the Slătineanu branch of his family, and completed a biographical study on Ion Slătineanu, governor of Brăila in the 1830s (hosted by the magazine Analele Brăilei, 1/1929).

Some of Filitti's biographical work was dedicated to the 16th-century Wallachian hero Michael the Brave. In 1931, he published an investigation of Michael's early career as titular Ban of Oltenia. A year later, he detailed Michael's introduction of serfdom in Wallachia: Despre "legătura" lui Mihai Viteazul ("On 'Bondage' under Michael the Brave"). Between these, the academic review Analele Economice și Statistice, Vol. XIV, reissued the 1857 count of emancipated Romani slaves, annotated by Filitti. In 1932, returning to the history of Oltenian Bans, he gave an account on the Craiovești family history, taken up by Arhivele Olteniei journal. His ongoing research into social issues of the early 19th century produced another book, Frământări politice și sociale în Principatele române de la 1821 la 1828 ("Political and Social Turmoil in the Romanian Principalities from 1821 to 1828", Cartea Românească, 1932). It has been described as a "non-partisan analysis" of the Wallachian uprising of 1821 and its reverberations, and features detail on the property dispute between local Orthodox monks and their Greek Orthodox competitors.

=== Conservative theories and Principatele române... ===
By 1928, I. C. Filitti's writing was moving from sheer historical research, as he was taking a stand in political theory. As noted by Ioan Stanomir, Filitti's evolution in this direction marks a final cycle in the history of classical, "Burkean", conservatism in Romania, which did not have a political aspect, but was complementary and contemporary with the views of his rival Nicolae Iorga. According to Stanomir, the objectivity professed by Filitti the historiographer was at odds with his ambition to rehabilitate Junimea and the Conservative cause, to prolong their relevancy into the 1930s. Some of his core ideas were updated versions of 19th-century Junimist concepts: the praise of moderation and organicity, the rejection of state capitalism and its "pseudo-bourgeoisie", and in particular the critique of generous land reforms. Directly influenced by the agrarian skepticism of Carp and Maiorescu, Filitti argued that the division of large estates into non-lucrative plots had only enhanced endemic problems, such as poverty or an unskilled workforce, and had prevented an organic growth toward good governance. Filitti's diary chides the political establishment of Greater Romania for not obtaining sufficient guarantees of territorial integrity—particularly so against Russia's successor, the Soviet Union—and for deprofessionalizing the diplomatic corps.

From Maiorescu, Filitti borrowed the essential sociological concept of "forms without content", criticizing all modernization which did not take into account local realities, writing: "After seven decades of bourgeois forms, without a bourgeoisie, with all that maelstrom of laws and regulations, which has grown to cover 20,000 pages [...], the tally shows that [...] the villages of all places have registered no profit, although [...] Romania is, at heart, nothing but one giant village." In his post-Junimist studies, Filitti angrily noted that the PNL regime had only increased the ranks of the bureaucracy (and implicitly enlarged their political machine), perpetuating etatism. He proposed measures to counter this trend by encouraging a "rural bourgeoisie", "self-reliant", determined to reemerge "from the darkness and routine" of country life, and, in time, capable of supporting a national industry.

In 1932, Filitti, who kept a vivid interest in Romanian Orthodox history, published Biserici și ctitori ("Churches and Ktitors"). He was preoccupied with similar thoughts when he decided to sponsor the rebuilding and refurbishing of two ancestral churches: the Dormition Church in Slatina, originally built by his Slătineanu relatives (whom he commemorated with a coat of arms, displayed over the church entrance); and the Sfântul Dumitru de Jurământ Metochion of Constandie Filitti (whom he had reburied on church premises).

It was in 1934 that I. C. Filitti registered one of his greatest successes, when he published a revised and extended version of his 1904 study: Principatele române de la 1828 la 1834. Ocupațiunea rusească și Regulamentul Organic ("The Romanian Principalities from 1828 to 1834. The Russian Occupation and Regulamentul Organic"). The study even earned him accolades from Iorga, who called it "an extraordinarily rich work of pragmatic history". The work mainly documents the emergence of a civic consciousness, called "public spirit" by Filitti, over the years when Regulamentul was in force, and speaks about how the Moldo-Wallachian Russophile class turned Russophobic as it became acquainted with Tsarist autocracy. Principatele române... includes additional data on the rift between the liberal youth, with its ideal of national liberation, and the peasantry, more determined to terminate the corvée system. He continued to publish on topical issues of legal history, documenting the antique Wallachian form of Weregild (plata capului, "head payment"), and on historiography, with a Revista Istorică biography of Wallachian chronicler Radu Greceanu. His other book for that year was an extended political manifesto, Rătăcirile unei pseudo-burghezii și reforme ce nu se fac ("The Aberrations of a Pseudo-bourgeoisie and Reforms Not Effected").

In 1935, Filitti completed his Proprietatea solului în Principatele române până la 1864 ("Land Ownership in the Romanian Principalities to 1864") and Contribuții la istoria diplomatică a României în secolul al XIX-lea ("Contributions to the Diplomatic History of Romania in the 19th Century"). In Vechea organizare fiscală a Principatelor Române până la Regulamentul Organic ("On the Ancient Fiscal Order of the Romanian Principalities to Regulamentul Organic"), he discussed the proliferation of state taxes over the centuries, and the measure to which the Orthodox clergy was exempted. A fourth book, on literary history, saw print with the title Cărți vechi privitoare la români ("Old Books Relating to the Romanians"). Also in 1935, he released a selection of his memoirs, as Câteva amintiri ("Some Recollections"), and set in print his conferences for the state Radio Company: Dezvoltarea politică a României moderne ("The Political Development of Modern Romania"). Building on his previous research in Arhiva Gheorghe Grigore Cantacuzino, Filitti also contributed an article about the Romanian origins of French diplomat Maurice Paléologue (Adevărul daily, September 29, 1935) and edited for print the letters of Oltenian engineer Petrache Poenaru (Arhivele Olteniei, 74-76/1934).

His other contribution for 1935 was a collection of texts on political history, called Pagini din istoria României moderne ("Pages from the History of Modern Romania"). The volume criticized the PNL's historical narrative, Romania's answer to Whiggishness, and noted that, from the beginning, the Conservatives were closer to the models of classical liberalism than their revolutionist opponents. Published with the Lupta Graphic Arts Institute in 1936, Filitti's new essay revisited the birth and evolution of conservatism in the Danubian Principalities and then Romania: Conservatori și junimiști în viața politică românească ("Conservatives and Junimists in Romanian Political Life"). The work postulated that local conservatism had in fact originated within the first phase of Romanian liberalism, grouping opponents of the "extremist", "utopian", "exulted" force which became the National Liberal elite. He argued that, since the National Liberals had become the establishment and did away with their republican agenda, the Conservatives, "in reality moderate liberals", came to be falsely depicted as "reactionaries". His retrospective portrait of Junimea was, according to Stanomir, particularly "melancholy", his own Junimism "never abjured".

=== Final years ===
In 1936, I. C. Filitti wrote an article defining the scope and history of the Legislative Council. It was featured in the anniversary collection of articles published by Council President Ioan Ionescu-Dolj. His revised work on the Cantacuzinos, published in Bucharest as Notice sur les Cantacuzène du XIe au XVIIe siècles ("Note on the Cantacuzinos from the 11th to the 14th Century"), traced the family links between Cantacuzino-Nababul and 14th-century Byzantine Emperor John VI, whom Filitti identified as a usurper. Also then, he republished a political pamphlet by the 18th-century poet Alecu Văcărescu, with the journal Preocupări Literare.

Filitti was preparing his retirement from public life, and designated his only son Manole as a curator of the Filitti Archive. Filitti Jr was a lawyer, financier and amateur rugby footballer, who would later serve as manager of the Phoenix Oil Factory. Married to actress Mimi Enăceanu, he was for long based in Iași, sharing a villa with the poet Mihail Codreanu. It was there that Ioan C.'s grandson Ion was born in 1936. His baptism was a public affair involving some of the established aristocratic houses, and one of the last functions ever attended by Filitti Sr (who met and befriended Codreanu on the occasion).

The National Renaissance Front dictatorship, with King Carol II at its helm, put an end to democratic rule in Greater Romania. Under these circumstances, I. C. Filitti was recovered by the official school of historians. From 1938, sociologist Dimitrie Gusti employed Filitti as an external contributor to the standard Romanian dictionary, Enciclopedia României. His "fundamental" contribution was, according to Stanomir, the "Legislative Council" entry, included in Volume I. Together with I. C. Vântu, Filitti also wrote the section on the administrative reform, whereby Carol had replaced the counties with larger ținuturi. This entry justified Carol's ideas on territorial division, describing the new regions as organic, "moral, cultural, economic and financial" units. The two authors offered praise to the supposedly increased representative powers of communes, and to the laws protecting private property within urban domains. As noted by Georgeta Filitti, I. C. Filitti was again dissatisfied with the finished product: "The [Enciclopedia] copy he left comprises numerous rectifications to his own entries and observations made on those of other authors, which would be welcomed for any future reediting." Filitti's other contribution for 1938 is an eponymous volume about the 1821 Wallachian revolutionist Tudor Vladimirescu, with the subtitle: Rostul răscoalei lui ("The Purpose of His Revolt").

From May 1938, Filitti was also General Administrative Inspector of the kingdom. The outbreak of World War II again pushed him away from public life. Romania was an Axis country, and, as such, Bucharest endured heavy bombardments by the United States Air Force. The air attack of April 4, 1944, effectively destroyed the Filitti residence, its art collection (including Murano glassware) and scores of unedited documents. The historian survived, but, according to Georgeta Filitti, the incident "hastened his death".

I. C. Filitti died in September 1945, almost a year after King Michael's Coup broke with the Axis. By his own account, he had published 82 volumes, 267 topical articles, and completed some 700 family trees. Many of these texts were circular of "rectifications" to previous editions, addressed to the community of scientists at large.

== Legacy ==
Filitti's death occurred shortly before a Romanian communist regime came into existence. He was survived by his wife and son. An aristocrats by blood and conservatives by conviction, Ioan C.'s descendants and relatives suffered heavily as a result of the new policies: the outspoken anti-communist Filitti-Robănești became a political prisoner, as did his cousin Puiu Filitti, who had been the King's Adjutant. Alexandrina Filitti was stripped of virtually all her land during the land reform and nationalization, but still forced to meet agricultural quotas imposed by the government; when she failed to do so, Manole Filitti took it upon himself to face the consequences, and spent some three years in communist jails.

Upon release, Manole and part of the Filitti clan moved into a single Bucharest home, located near the Darvari Skete. Reintegrated as a clerk for nationalized enterprises, he remarried, in 1985, to historian Georgeta Penelea. Of Croat and Istro-Romanian ancestry, she is related to prestigious woman reporter Mihaela Catargi. Manole's son Ion had a career in engineering, but could not advance professionally due to his aristocratic lineage. He emigrated to West Germany, where a branch of the Filittis still resides.

Although officially censored, Filitti's work was not entirely inaccessible. As indicated by Victor Rizescu, under orthodox Marxism-Leninism, the idea of boyar precedence in the early Danubian Principalities was not discarded, but rather integrated within a "modes of production" theory. Some of Filitti's books were reprinted in the 1980s, when national communism allowed selective exposure to Romania's conservative schools of thought. As noted by historian Ovidiu Pecican, the regime was trying to encourage "autarkic xenophobia", preventing intellectuals from receiving Western ideas, but in exchange allowing them a selective recovery of old ideas. In 1985, Proprietatea solului..., Frământări politice și sociale... and România față de capitulațiile Turciei were reissued in critical editions. On the academic side, the main contributor to this particular recovery project was Georgeta Penelea-Filitti, also distinguished as the editor of books by Iorga, Mihail Kogălniceanu, and other intellectual figures.

The Romanian Revolution of 1989 resulted in more consideration being granted to I. C. Filitti, as both researcher and polemicist. The Filitti Archive, preserved by Manole Filitti, was divided into separate funds, and divided between several institutions: the Romanian Academy Library, the National Archives, the Cotroceni Palace collection, and the Ialomița County Museum. Selections from the historian's diaries were published by Georgeta Filitti as fascicles in the academic review Revista Istorică, during the early 1990s. Beginning 2008, she published the diary in book form, with the Ialomița Museum press and Cetatea de Scaun company of Târgoviște.

Romania's academic community was thus prompted to reassess the overall value of Ioan C. Filitti's work. The popular history review Magazin Istoric grants an I. C. Filitti Award as one of its four annual distinctions for exceptional research and writing. In 2009, Editura Compania company published historian Dan Berindei's book of scholarly biographies, which notably includes a chapter on Filitti. According to Boia, Berindei bracketed out Filitti's entire career in occupied Romania, while expressing a vague regret that Filitti never reached his full potential in diplomacy. Boia asks rhetorically: "the historian knows [the reason for this], shouldn't the reader also find it out?" According to political scientist Cristian Cercel, Ioan Stanomir takes credit for having helped recover Filitti's contributions as conservative theorist, which had been "all too soon forgotten." In his 2004 book Conștiința conservatoare ("The Conservative Consciousness"), Stanomir places Filitti alongside Constantin Rădulescu-Motru, Alexandru Duțu and Virgil Nemoianu, as one of the intellectuals who preserved a place for Junimist conservatism into the latter 20th century and beyond.
