= Kurkhars =

Traditional Ingushetian headdress

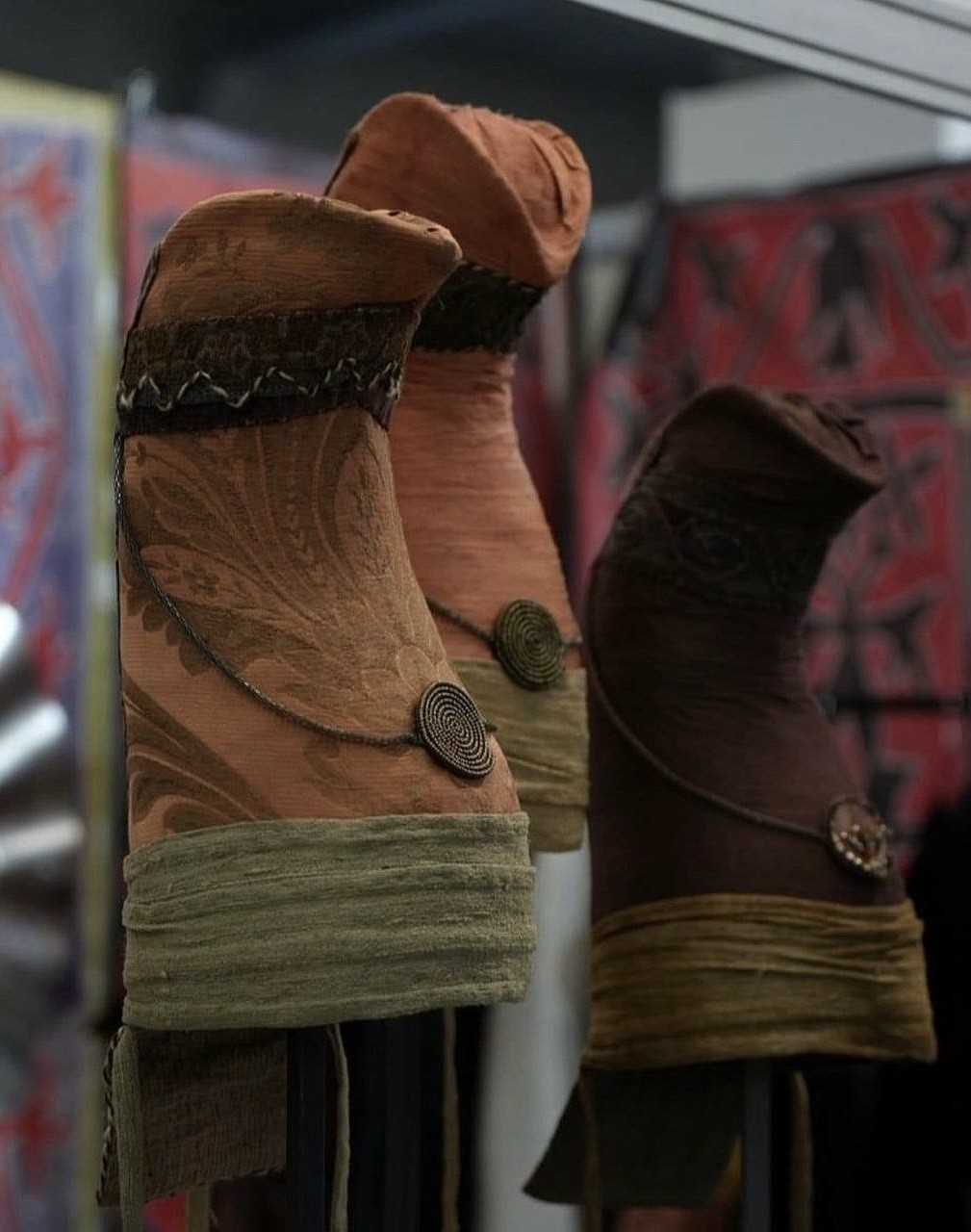
- Type: Headdress
- Material: Red felt or dense cloth
- Place of origin: Ingushetia

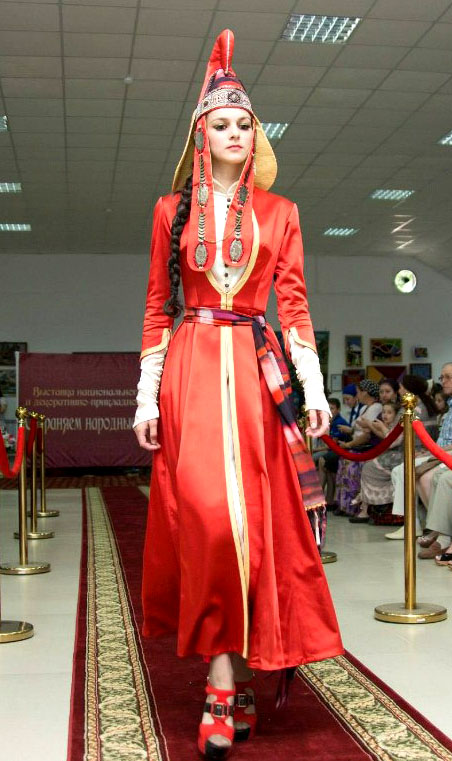
Ingush national women's costume, which features the kurkhars

Kurkhars (Ingush: Курхарс) is the traditional female headdress of the Ingush. Its male counterpart is the bashlyk. It was traditionally a weekend clothing of the Ingush, worn during the holidays and for "going out". They are usually made of red felt or dense cloth and were originally made out of tanned and dyed bull scrotum. They are high caps in the form of a ridge with a forward curve and forked end.

First mentioned in a 17th-century article list of Russian ambassadors describing their route through the Ingush lands to Georgia, researchers consider kurkhars, like the bashlyk, to be in a historical and cultural relationship with the ancient headdress of the Scythians and Phrygians, via the so-called Phrygian cap, which was also most notably worn by the Persians, Thracians and Dacians.

== Archaeology ==
A large collection of kurkharses were collected by archaeologists from a tower-shaped two-story crypt of the late Middle Ages in the village of Päling. The finds amazed scientists not only with their abundance, but also with their rich decoration, which used both local materials and very expensive imported fabrics (silk, semi-silk, satin, velvet, and brocade) of Iranian, Chinese, Egyptian, Syrian, Russian production. A kurkhars was made using gold and silver embroidery and using various materials: felt, leather, beads, shells, and silver plaques. Techniques were also distinguished by originality and special elegance.

In 2022, due to natural causes, one of the walls of the crypt of the Tsori tower complex in mountainous Ingushetia collapsed, where, among many valuable finds, archaeologists discovered 11 kurkharses in varying degrees of preservation.

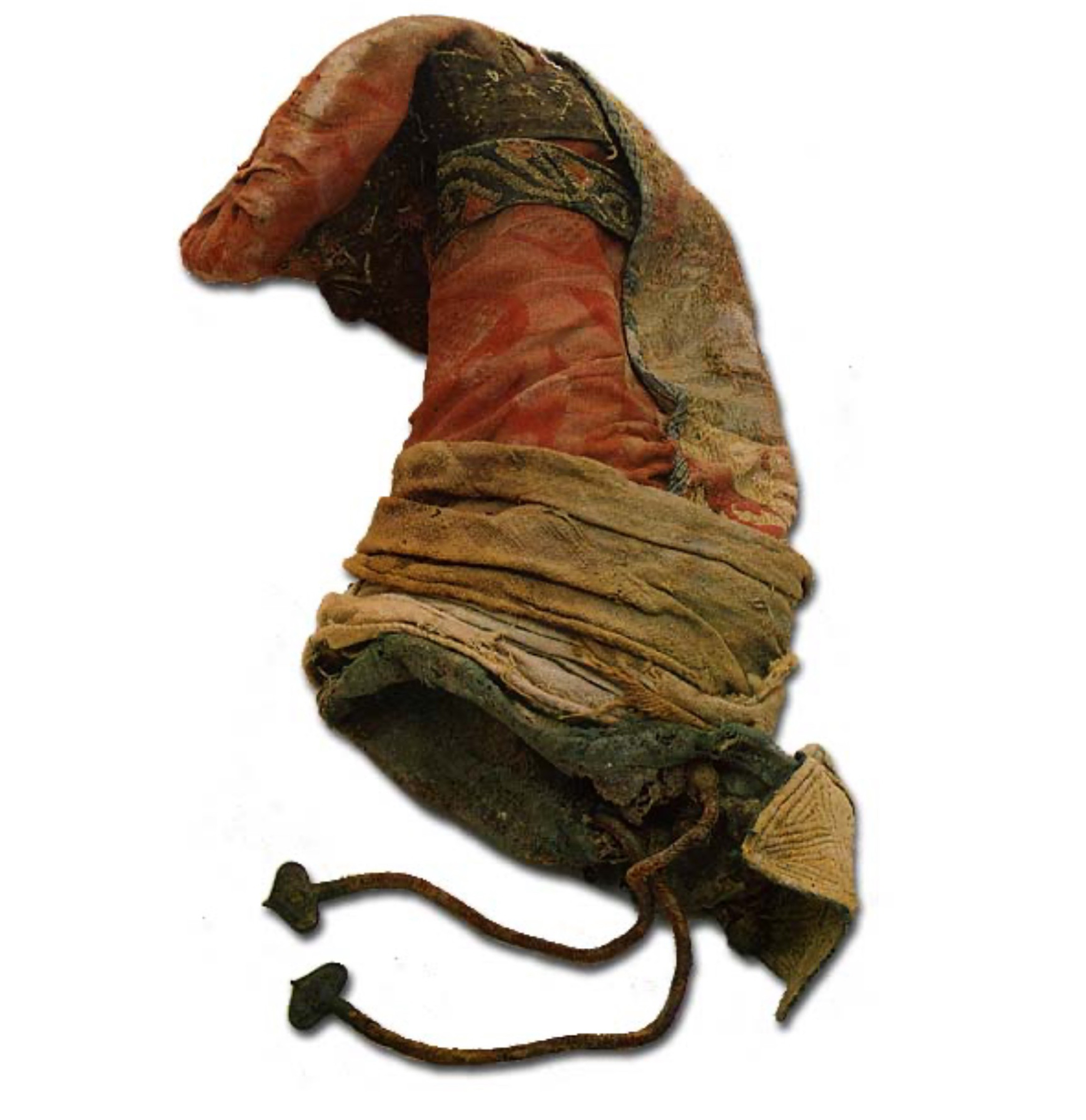
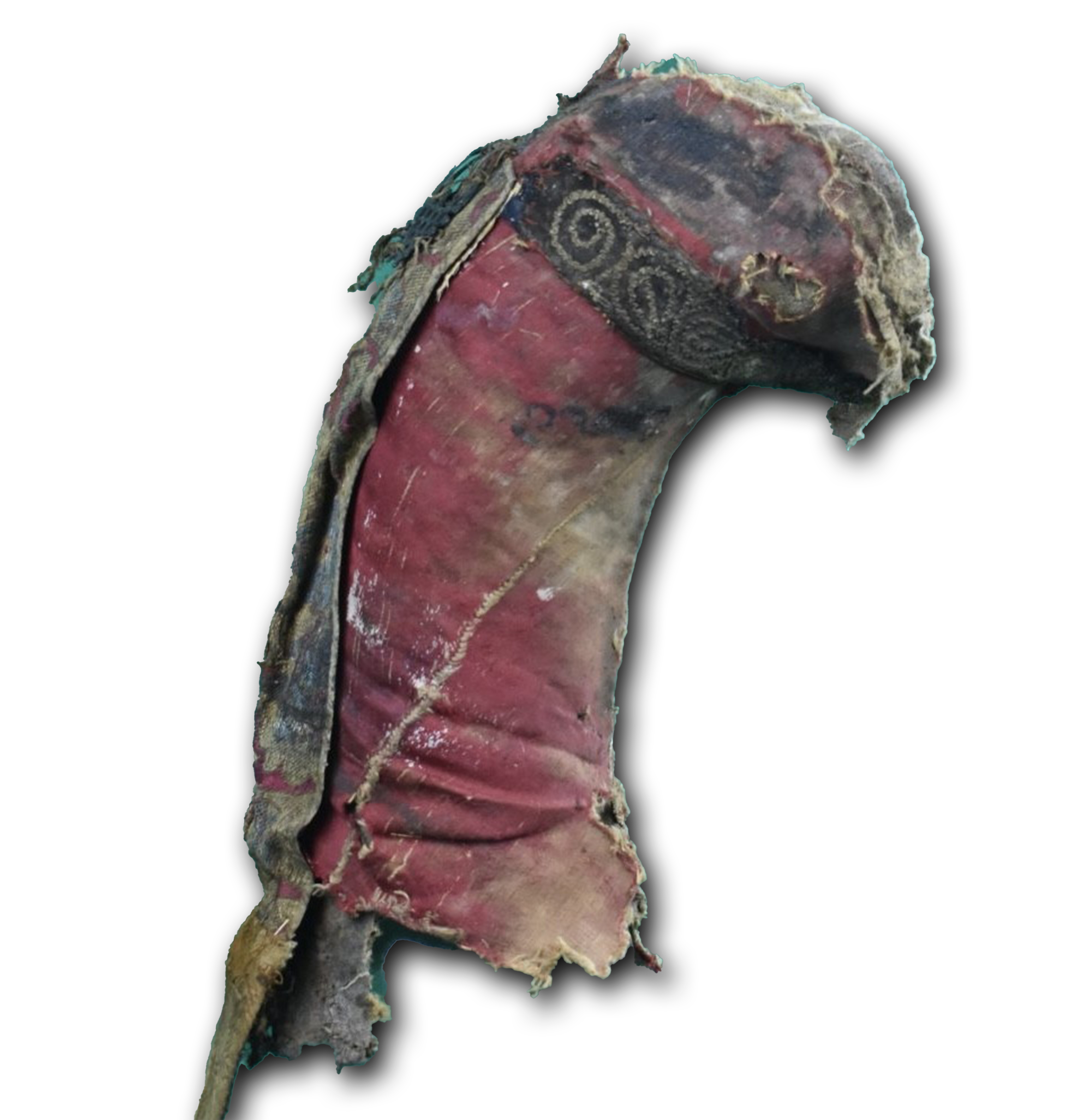
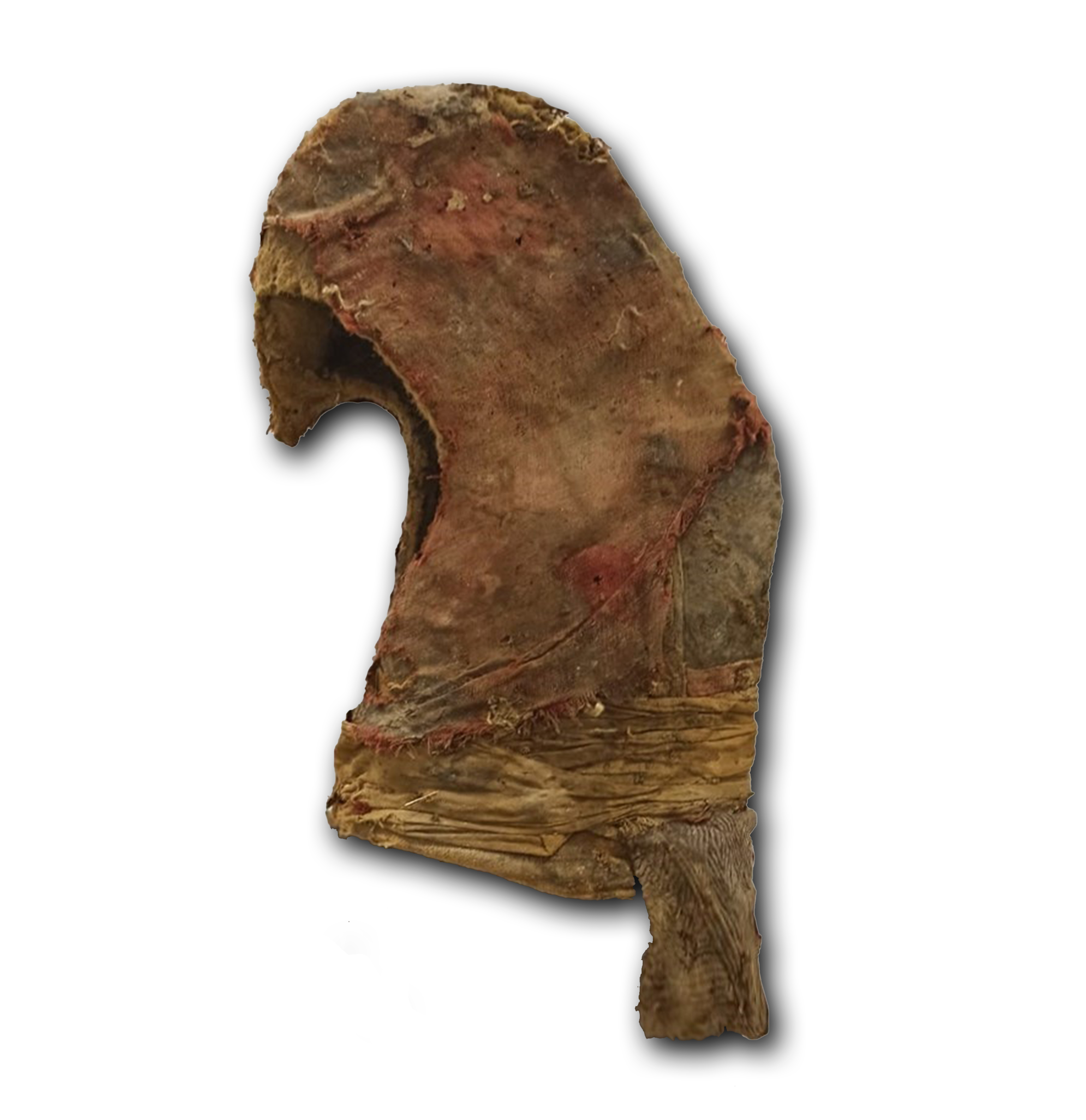
Kurkhars headresses found in Ingushetia

== Sources ==
- Chakhkiev, D. Yu. (1998). "Башнеобразный склеп в селении Пялинг" [Tower-shaped crypt in the village of Pyaling]. In Chakhkiev, D. Yu.; et al. (eds.). Новое в археологии и этнографии Ингушетии: Сборник статей [New in archeology and ethnography of Ingushetia: Collection of articles] (in Russian). Nalchik: El-Fa. pp. 46–82. ISBN 5-88195-312-6.
- Dolgieva, M. B.; Kartoev, M. M.; Kodzoev, N. D.; Matiev, T. Kh. (2013). Kodzoev, N. D.; et al. (eds.). История Ингушетии [History of Ingushetia] (4th ed.). Rostov-Na-Donu: Yuzhnyy izdatelsky dom. pp. 1–600. ISBN 978-5-98864-056-1.
- Genko, A. N. (1930). "Из культурного прошлого ингушей" [From the cultural past of the Ingush] (PDF). Записки коллегии востоковедов при Азиатском музее [Notes of the College of Orientalists at the Asian Museum] (PDF) (in Russian). Vol. 5. Leningrad: Izd-vo Akademii nauk SSSR. pp. 681–761.
- Semyonov, L. P. (1935). "Археологические и этнографические разыскания в Ингушетии 1930-32 гг." [Archaeological and ethnographic research in Ingushetia 1930-32]. Izv. INII (in Russian). IV (2). Ordzhonikidze-Grozny: Serdalo: 143–191.
- Semyonov, L. P. (1959). "Фригийские мотивы в древней ингушской культуре" [Phrygian motifs in ancient Ingush culture]. Izv. ChINIIIYAL (in Russian). 1. Grozny: ChI kn. izd-vo: 197–219.
