= Işlic =

High-crowned cap

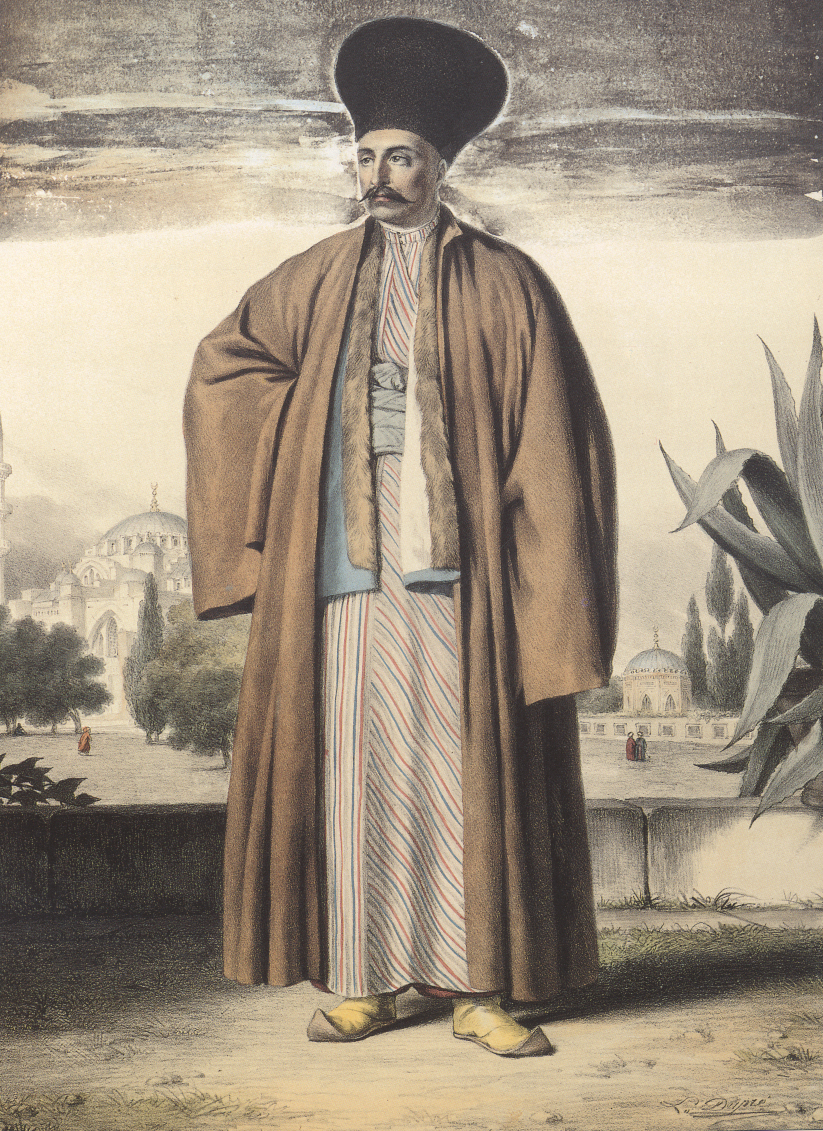
An Armenian man wearing an işlic

The işlic or ishlik is a form of high-crowned cap that was commonly worn by the Greek Orthodox boyars of Wallachia and Moldavia, Phanariots, and Armenians in the Ottoman Empire into the mid-nineteenth century. Along with the oriental costume that exemplified the fashion and strict social hierarchy of the boyar class, the işlic fell out of favor by the 1840s.

== History ==
The origins of the işlic date to the late Byzantine Empire. The depiction of Theodore Metochites in the 14th century dedication mosaic of the Chora Church may portray an ishlik. It was an important part of the costume of Wallachian and Moldavian boyars, as the size, shape, and type of felt from which an işlic was made indicated one's rank in the social hierarchy of the Ottoman Danubian Principalities. For example, boyars of the highest rank (Great Boyars) wore large işlics made of sable felt. Boyars of lower ranks wore smaller işlics of less expensive felt, sometimes topped with large square cushions. The işlic was distinctively top-heavy, and frequently attracted the attention of Western travelers in the Danubian Provinces. The color of the felt atop a boyar's işlic was also indicative of the public office he held.

== Gallery ==
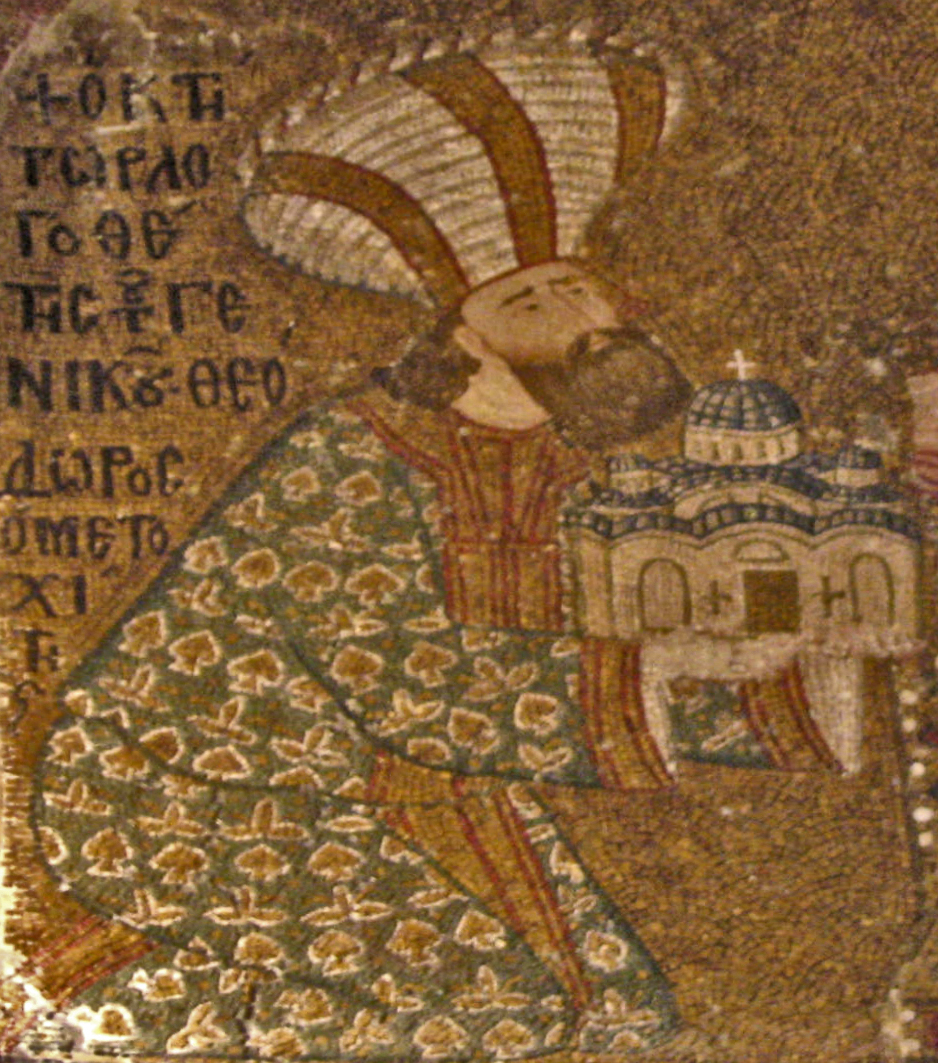
Theodore Metochites wearing what may be an ishlik, early 14th century

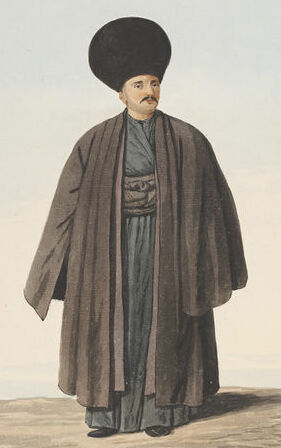
An Armenian official in Istanbul, 1809

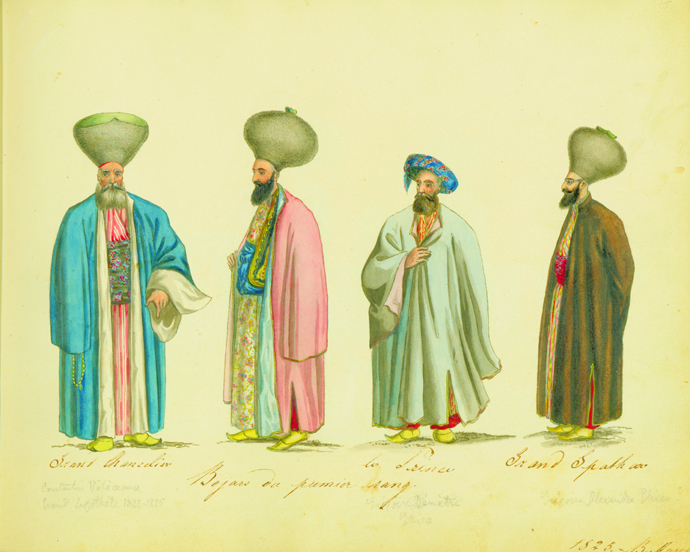
Great Boyars of Wallachia wearing large işlics, 1825

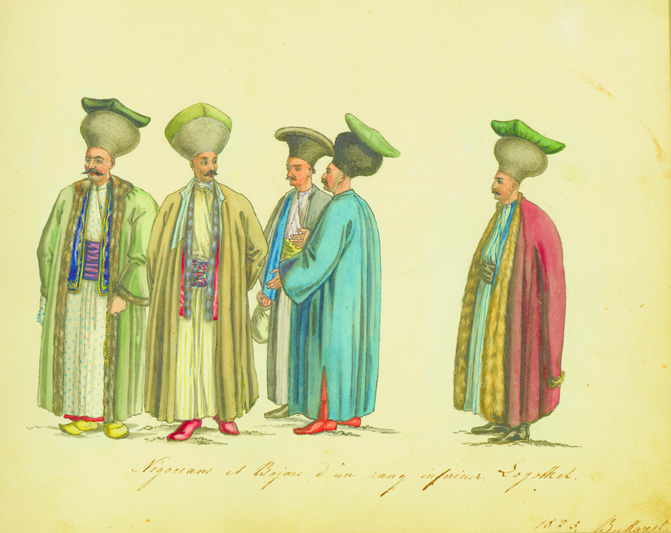
Wallachian boyars of the third rank wearing small işlics adorned with cushions, 1825

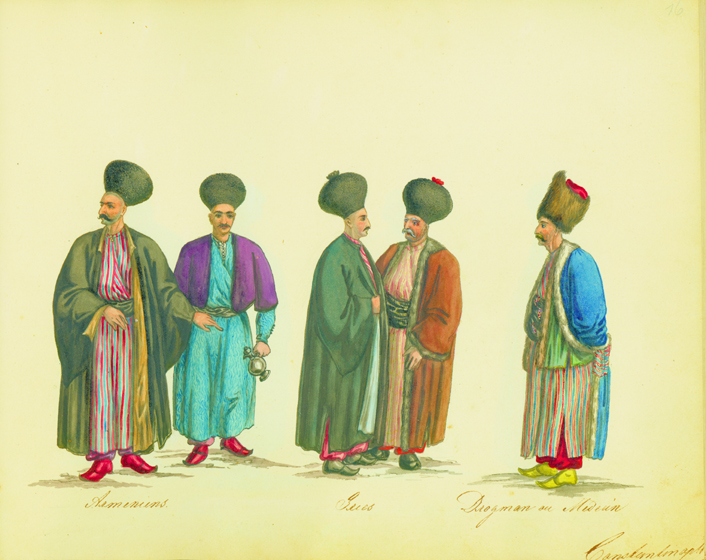
Armenians and Greeks of Istanbul wearing işlics, 1825

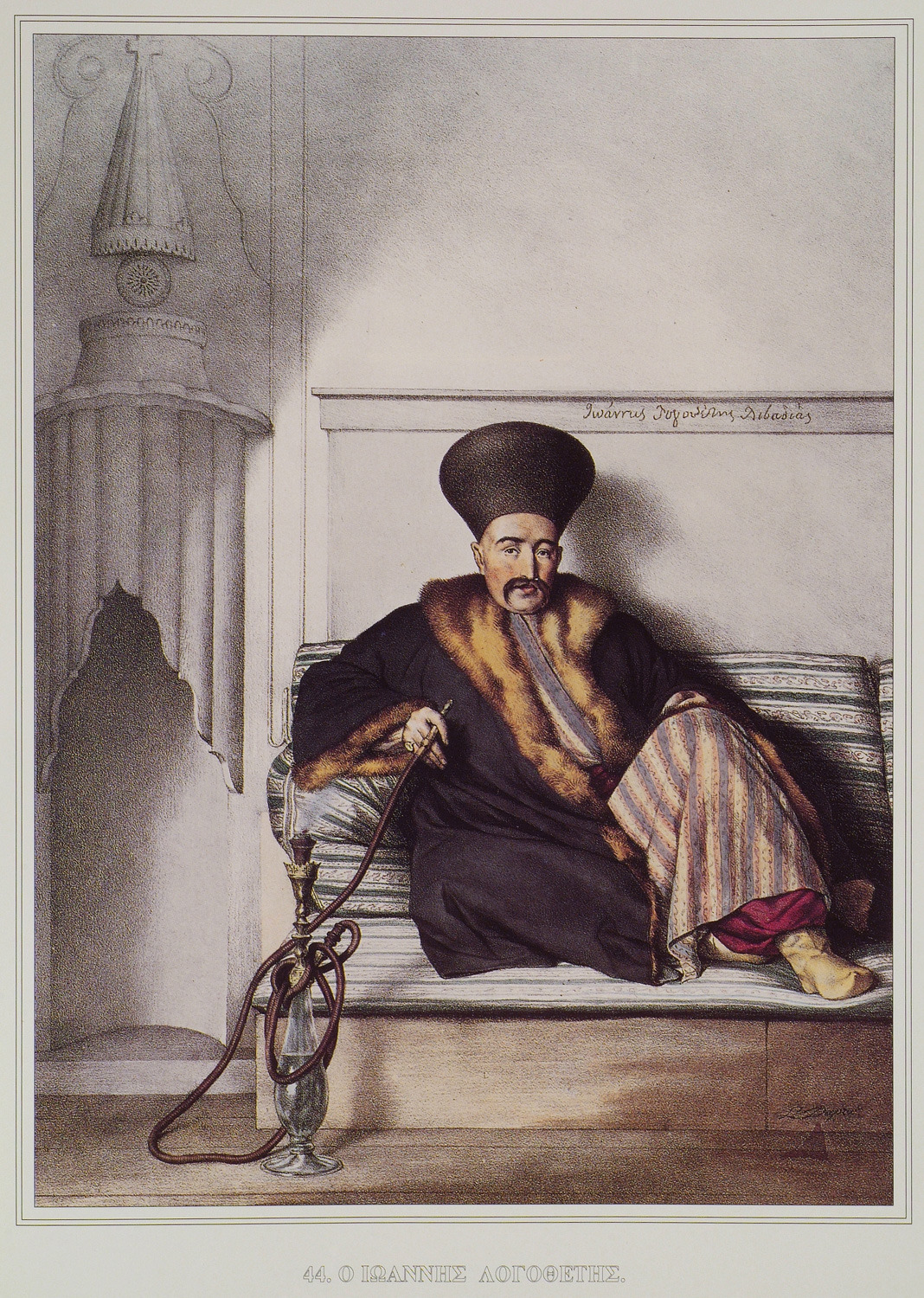
Ioannis Logothetis, Governor of Aegina in newly independent Greece depicted wearing an ishlik, 1827

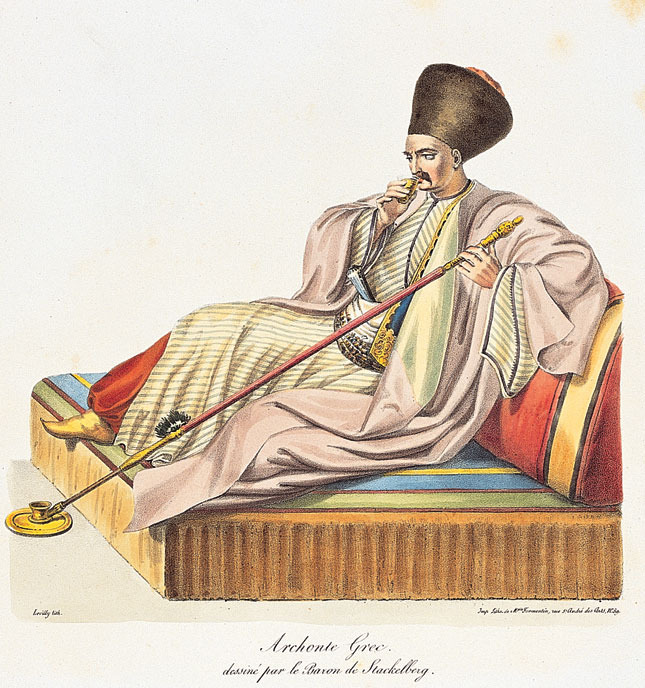
A Greek archon wearing an ishlik, 1828

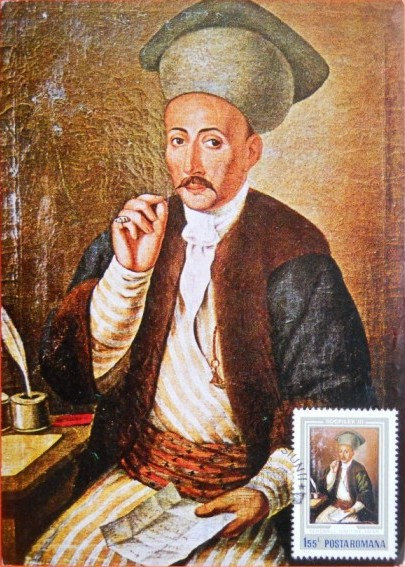
A portrait of Serdarul Dimitrie Aman by Constantin Lecca featuring an işlic topped with a cushion

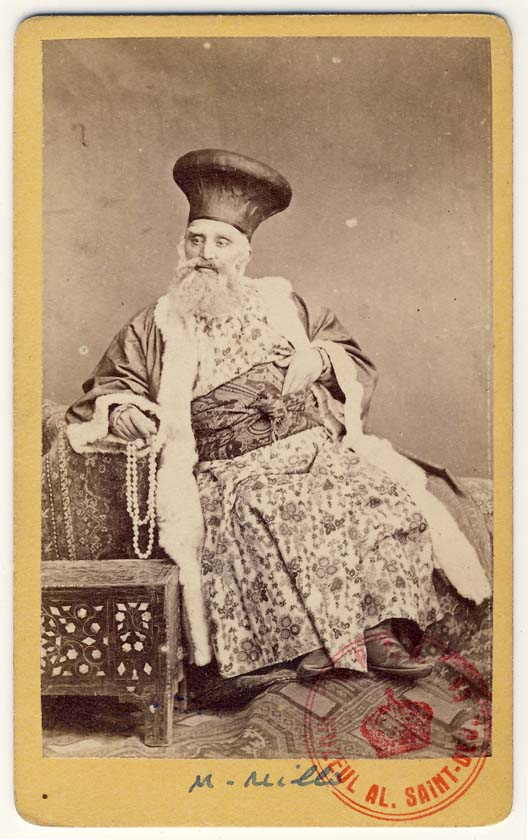
Actor Matei Millo dressed in a theatrical costume featuring an imitation işlic, 1860s

== See also ==
- List of hat styles
- Gugiuman
- Kalpak
