= Obște =

Autonomous agricultural community

The obște (pl. obști) was an autonomous agricultural community of the Romanians of the Middle Ages. Mixing private and common ownership, the communities generally employed an open field system. The obști were usually based on one or more extended families. This system of organization was similar throughout the Romanian-inhabited areas and it generally receded as overlords assumed more power over the rural communities and as the peasants lost their freedom by becoming serfs.

== Etymology ==
The word obște is of Slavic origin, its original meaning being "common", referring to the common ownership and usage of the fields. Nevertheless, the organization system predates the Slavic contact, previously the word for community being cătun (cognate with Albanian katund), a word that changed its meaning in modern Romanian into "hamlet" or "mountain village".

== Characteristics ==
The villages, autonomous and lacking a political superstructure, employed their own defense system: the very words for village in Romanian (sat, archaic fsat) and Albanian (fshat) are derived from the Latin word fossatum, meaning "a ditch used for fortifications".

Most villages were not ancient, but they were founded and discarded during successive colonization steps. As extensive farming was used, the areas with depleted soil were abandoned for new land, often obtained through deforestation. Sometimes, they were divided into more groups, each looking to found its own obște on fertile land, something known as the "swarming of the obști" (roirea obștilor).

The villagers in an obște were often the descendants of the founder (or sometimes, founders) of the village, which was known as moș ("forefather"). By the 16th century, in Wallachia, each extended family (moșneni, people with a common forefather) had its own tracts of land which they used in common.

The obști had their own common law system, known in Romanian as obiceiul pământului ("custom of the land"), an unwritten law system which set rules for the relations between the villagers, including the rules for the usage of the land. The obști had judicial powers on their members, the elders of the village being the judges.

== Origins ==
Whereas some historians such as Ioan C. Filitti argued that the obști were an exceptional way of organization and a recent development, Nicolae Iorga argued that the obște was one of the most ancient institutions of the Romanian peasant, being prior to the founding of the medieval Romanian states.

Some historians such as P. P. Panaitescu argued that its origin can be found in the organization of the Dacian settlements, which was revived following the Roman retreat. As arguments for its origin being previous to the Slavic contact are given words such as gint (pl. ginture) which was a term of Latin origin (from gens/gentilis) to refer to a community formed by an extended family.

== History ==
As the feudal states were created, the obști were affected by the system of princely decrees, which gave land (danii) to a newly created nobility. This led to a gradual disappearance of the common ownership of land, transforming the free peasants into serfs. The feudal system, which was already formed by the 15th century, did not destroy the obști, but a greater number of obști became serf obști: while the Hospodar or the boyars owned the whole villages, they kept their internal organization.

At the beginning of the 20th century, it was still found in some mountainous areas of Romania, such as Vrancea and Câmpulung in Moldavia as well as Rucăr in Wallachia.
