= Malahai =

Historical headgear from Central Asia

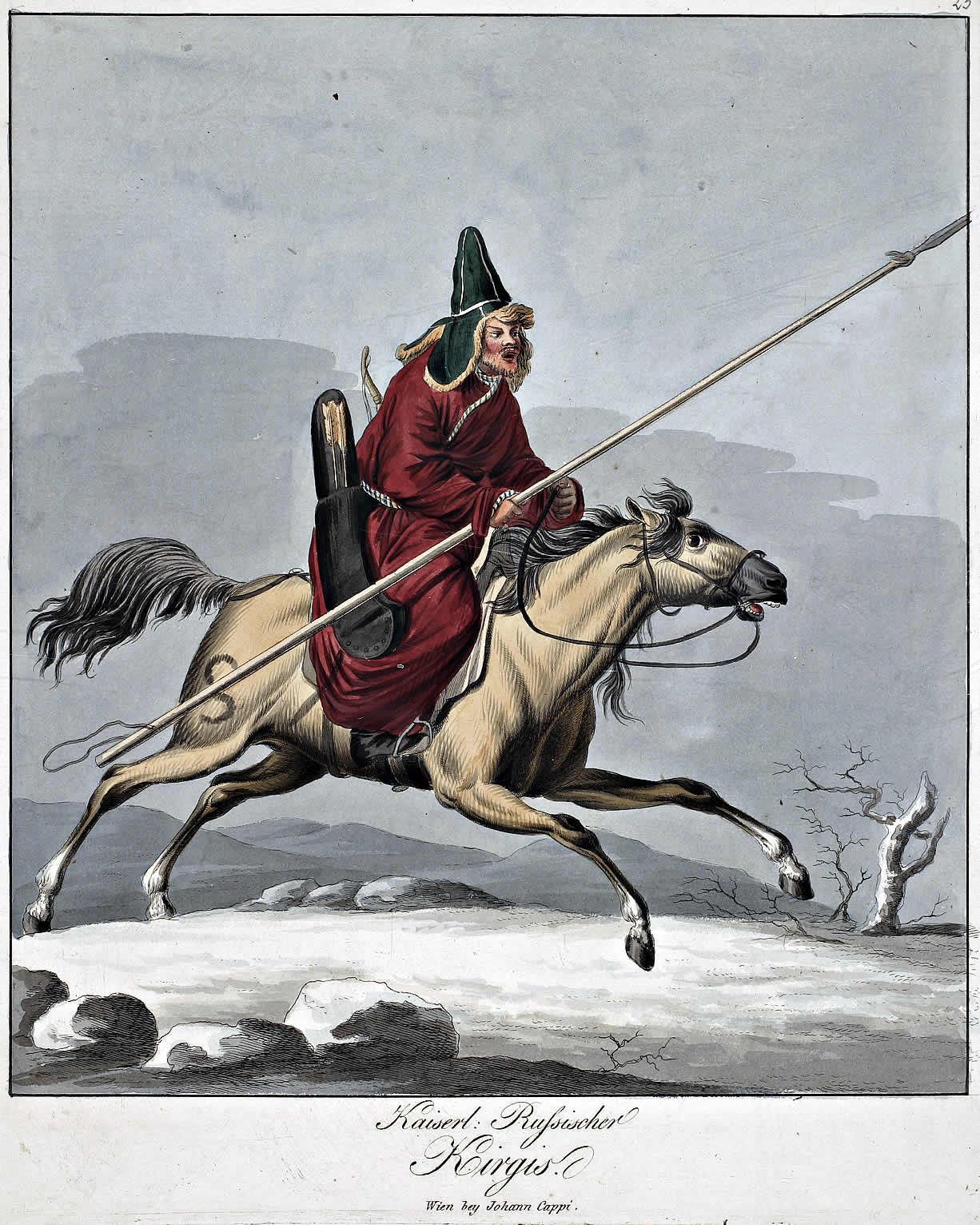
A Kazakh or Kyrgyz (Note: See Kyrgyz-Kaysaks for 19-th century terminology) man wearing a malahai, an early-19th-century painting

The malahai^{[a]} (Russian: малаха́й or малакай,^{[b]} Kazakh: малақай) is a historical headgear originating in present-day Kazakhstan, which was adopted in some of other regions of Central Asia and worn throughout the Russian Empire from the mid-18th to mid-19th centuries. It is a fur hat with a noticeably high conical, cylindrical, or quadrangular crown^{[c]} and flaps that are typically four: two long side-flaps covering the ears, a wide rear one covering the neck and shoulders, and a short front one functioning as a visor. It is lined with furs of diverse animals, which include badger, fox, and wolf.

Worn by men in winter to protect themselves against the cold and withstand the elements on the road, the headgear also served as a soft protective helmet against bladed weapons. It was worn by women in some parts of Russia. Among Old Believers it was proscribed over religious reasons.

== Etymology ==
The etymology of the word malahai is disputed. Although most philologists agree that it was derived from the Mongolian word malgai (малгай or malaɣai̯) meaning 'hat', they disagree on how the word came to the Russian language. The wide distribution of the word in the Turkic languages led some to theorize that it had entered Russian via Turkic—according to Hungarian linguist Éva Csáki, Manchurian speakers loaned the Mongolian word without -i and the word regained -i only after it entered the Kipchak languages—but others believe that the word had come from Manchurian and Mongolian speakers living in southeastern Siberia and then the word entered, on the contrary, Turkic via Russian.

== Design and materials ==
The extant images of Kazakh men wearing malahais were created in the 18th and 19th centuries by Russian, Western European, and Qing-dynasty Chinese artists and, toward the end of the 19th century, photographed by Russian officials, soldiers, and travelers. As of 2012, seven authentic malahais with varying degrees of damage survived in museums and private collections in China, Kazakhstan, and Russia.

Its crown was in general 40–50 centimetres (16–20 in) high and either conical, cylindrical, or quadrangular. The headgear typically had four flaps and the front one, rectangular and shorter than the rest, was habitually folded upward and only lowered to cover the wearer's forehead during severe cold snaps or snowstorms. The side-flaps or "ears" (naushi) were tied together either on top of the wearer's chin or under the chin, with leather straps or ribbons sewn on the flaps. The wide rear-flap covered the wearer's neck and shoulders. Malahai was made of sheepskin, deerskin, and calfskin, and lined with furs of diverse animals such as beaver, fox, badger, and wolf, while its outermost layer was made of cloth, brocade, silk, or velvet.

== In Russia ==
Malahai became part of the Russian clothing in the mid-18th century after the Bashkirs and Kalmyks introduced the headgear to the country. By the mid-19th century, its use had spread throughout Siberia and European Russia; however, before the 19th century ended, it had been mostly replaced by ushanka in the Russian Empire.

In Russia, it was most often worn on the road and, as such, became a distinctive headgear of coachmen in Siberia. Worn by men in winter to protect themselves against the cold and withstand the elements, it also served as a soft protective helmet against bladed weapons. In some regions of Russia, it was worn by women as well.

Among Old Believers—Eastern Orthodox Christians who maintain the liturgical and ritual practices of the Russian Orthodox Church as they were before the 17th-century reforms of Patriarch Nikon of Moscow—wearing malahai was forbidden because the wearer of the headgear cast a silhouette that allegedly resembled that of a horned demon, and some malahais were lined with wolf fur, which was proscribed for them to wear especially in group prayer meetings.

== See also ==
- List of hat styles
- List of fur headgear
- List of headgear

== Explanatory notes ==
a. Variously romanized as malahai, malahay, malakai, malaxay, malaqai, malaqay, malakaj, and malakhai

b. Pronounced [məɫɐˈxaj] and [məɫəˈkəj] respectively

c. The term malahai applies to the ones with high (40–50 centimetres or 16–20 inches) crowns only; those with low crowns are called tumaq.
