= Petre P. Panaitescu =

Romanian literary historian (1900–1967)

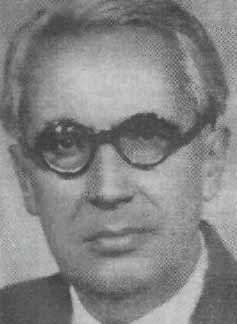
- Born: March 11, 1900; Iași, Kingdom of Romania
- Died: November 14, 1967 (aged 67)
- Education: University of Bucharest; Jagiellonian University
- Occupations: literary historian, university professor, researcher
- Years active: 1923–1965

Petre P. Panaitescu (March 11, 1900 – November 14, 1967) was a Romanian literary historian. A native of Iași, he spent most of his adult life in the national capital Bucharest, where he rose to become a professor at its main university. As such, he challenged various aspects of the dominant nationalist historiography. However, he also joined the ultra-nationalist Iron Guard, and headed the university during the movement's brief time in power. After the Guard was violently suppressed at the beginning of 1941, he lost his professorial position. When a communist-dominated government entered office in early 1945, he was arrested and imprisoned. Panaitescu was freed by the end of the year, the new authorities finding useful his theories of Slavic influence on Romania's national trajectory. He worked as a researcher in the latter part of his career, retiring in 1965, two years before his death.

== Biography ==
=== Education and early career ===
Born in Iași to engineer Panait Panaitescu and his wife Leonia (née Greceanu), he attended primary school in his native city, followed by high school in Bucharest. He attended the literature and philosophy faculty of the University of Bucharest from 1918 to 1922, and took specialty courses at Jagiellonian University in Kraków from 1923 to 1924. From 1924 to 1926, he was a member of the Romanian school at Fontenay-aux-Roses. His first published work appeared in Revista istorică in 1917; the article dealt with a court case in the Danubian Principalities. Other magazines to which he contributed include Convorbiri Literare, Studii, Arhiva românească, Buletinul Comisiei Istorice a României, Romanoslavica, Studii și cercetări de istorie medie, Revista Fundațiilor Regale, Memoriile Secției Istorice a Academiei, Mélanges de l’École Roumaine en France and Viața Românească, as well as Polish and Soviet reviews. His first book, from 1923, was a biographical study of Nicolae Bălcescu.

In 1925, he earned a doctorate in history; his thesis analyzed the Polish influence on the works and personalities of the chroniclers Grigore Ureche and Miron Costin. Subsequently, he became a professor at his alma mater, and was elected a corresponding member of the Romanian Academy in 1934.

=== View of history, Guardist affiliation and downfall ===
Together with Gheorghe I. Brătianu and Constantin C. Giurescu, Panaitescu was a member of the "new school" of Romanian history that published in Revista istorică română and defined itself in opposition to Nicolae Iorga and his Revista istorică. He wrote a 1936 study of Michael the Brave that de-emphasized the dominant narrative of Michael as hero, and focused instead on the social class that dictated his actions, namely the boyars. The book drew a harsh review from Iorga, who claimed Panaitescu was bringing Michael down from his pedestal, and even committing lèse-majesté by claiming he was not the son of Pătrașcu the Good.

He questioned major elements of other Romanian historical myths, prioritizing material, social and cultural structures over the heroic and personalized approach. In a 1944 article, he asserted that the Ottoman Empire failed to directly incorporate the Principalities not because of the struggles of Romanians against the Turks (an important theme in mainstream historiography), but because the Ottomans' thrust into Europe lay along a different path, and they found it more advantageous to exploit the area indirectly. Like Ioan Bogdan, he considered that the Slavs were important in medieval Romanian history, even considering the indigenous boyar class to be of Slav origin; on the other hand, he followed Dimitrie Onciul in downplaying the notion of Daco-Roman continuity. Challenging Alexandru Dimitrie Xenopol's thesis regarding the Byzantine influence on national culture, he asserted that Romanians between the ninth and the eighteenth century had adopted a Slavo-Byzantine culture. For him, far from being a misfortune of history, this development was necessary given the prevailing social, economic and spiritual conditions. It also fostered national cohesion, allowing Romanians in the three historical provinces of Moldavia, Wallachia and Transylvania to resist foreign invasion and denationalization. He added that early Romanians failed to adopt Western culture because its technical and urban nature was alien to them.

Despite his anti-nationalist stance as a historian, Panaitescu belonged to the extreme nationalist Iron Guard for a time. Under the National Legionary State (September 1940-January 1941), he was the University of Bucharest's rector as well as editor of Cuvântul newspaper, which was replete with historical-mythological constructs. The sole full professor in the literature faculty who belonged to the Guard, he had kept his position and perhaps his life during the National Renaissance Front regime's wave of repression against the movement in 1938-1939 thanks to the intervention of Giurescu, Mihai Ralea and Alexandru Rosetti. Ralea, a close friend of Interior Minister Armand Călinescu, spent more than three hours arguing with Călinescu until the latter removed Panaitescu's name from a list of Guardists to be interned. Many of those interned were subsequently killed. Following the assassination of Iorga in late November 1940, Panaitescu and dean Alexandru Marcu did fly the flag at half-mast, but this was quickly replaced by Guardist students with the movement's green banner.

As a result of the January 1941 suppression of the Guard, Panaitescu's university career was over, and he was suspended from his department effective March 1. Starting in June 1943, he worked at the Peace Bureau, an office created by Foreign Minister Mihai Antonescu with the scope of formulating Romanian demands at the peace conference that was bound to follow when the ongoing World War II came to an end.

=== Under communism ===
Due to his enthusiasm for the Iron Guard and his articles in Cuvântul, he was arrested in April 1945, under the new Romanian Communist Party-dominated government; following an agreement between former Guard leaders and Soviet agent Alexandru Nicolschi, Panaitescu and those imprisoned alongside him were released that December. Starting in 1946 and through the end of 1948, he was a technical adviser at the Romanian-Russian Museum. Meanwhile, in the summer of 1948, he became section director of the Balkan studies and research institute, which was soon folded into the academy's history institute, where he remained until his retirement in 1965. Also that summer, he was stripped of his Academy membership.

It was only in 1954 that he managed to resume work openly as a researcher, at the Nicolae Iorga Institute. For several years prior, he was obliged to write under the pseudonym Al. Grecu. Despite his undesirable past, the regime found him useful as a Slavist who focused on historical ties between Romanians and Russians, or the activities of the peasantry. In his later years, he wrote several weighty volumes about early Romanian history, including a 1958 study of Dimitrie Cantemir's life and work, a 1965 analysis of written Romanian's beginnings and a posthumous 1969 introduction to Romanian cultural history.
