= Diamandi Djuvara =

Ottoman–Wallachian soldier (died 1821)

Cârc-Serdar in Oltenia
- In office ? – January 1821
- Preceded by: Stoica
- Succeeded by: Ioan Solomon

Personal details
- Born: Διαμαντή Τζουβάρα (Diamantí Tzouvára) Ioannina, Sanjak of Ioannina, Ottoman Empire
- Died: 14 August 1821 Istanbul, Ottoman Empire
- Spouse: 2 wives

Military service
- Allegiance: Wallachia; Sacred Band
- Years of service: ?–1821
- Battles/wars: Wallachian uprising of 1821; Greek War of Independence; Second Battle of Drăgășani

Diamandi or Iamandì Djuvara, also known as Giuvara, Juvara or Tzouvara (Greek: Διαμαντή Τζουβάρα, romanized: Diamantí Tzouvára; died 14 August 1821), was an Ottoman–Wallachian mercenary and boyar, with the rank of Serdar. Greek-speaking, he originated from the ethnically diverse Sanjak of Ioannina, and had various Balkan identities ascribed to him; some historians conclude that he was an Aromanian, like other carriers of the name "Djuvara", with whom he was likely related. He arrived to Wallachia during the final stages of Phanariote rule over that country. By the 1810s, as a military expert, he was serving Prince John Caradja in dealing with the emergence of anti-state brigandage in Oltenia. Djuvara never managed to capture in combat the celebrated hajduk Iancu Jianu, but used deceitful tactics in apprehending two of Jianu's allies, Nikola Abraš and Receb Ağa. He honored a peace agreement with Jianu, but was unable to prevent Jianu's imprisonment by Caradja.

Djuvara's activities allowed him to amass personal wealth, which allegedly included Abraš's confiscated loot; he used the gold to purchase land in Romanați County, where he created the eponymous village of Giuvărăști. Initially disliked by Romanian nationalists as an incompetent "Greek", he was removed from his executive position by the last Phanariote Prince, Alexandros Soutzos, who appointed the local Ioan Solomon as Serdar in early 1821. Djuvara may have by then entered conspiratorial politics with the Filiki Eteria, and is sometimes seen as a participant in Soutzos' alleged assassination. Immediately after Soutzos' death, political life in Wallachia was disturbed by the twinned effects of the Greek War of Independence and the anti-Phanariote uprising. The Wallachian Boyars' Divan counted on Djuvara to crush the latter rebellion, but he negotiated a deal with rebel leader Tudor Vladimirescu, joined the insurgency alongside Solomon and Dimitrie Macedonski, and captured Craiova from the Divan.

Djuvara then participated in Vladimirescu's march on Bucharest. He was also in contact with the Sacred Band, which had penetrated into northern Wallachia and was claiming it on behalf of the Greek Revolution. Djuvara negotiated between the two revolutions, and formally joined the Band in early May, presenting his homages to Alexander Ypsilantis and the Filiki Eteria. He sought to obtain control over the fortifications at Cozia Monastery on Ypsilantis' behalf, but was instantly met with Vladimirescu's opposition. Unlike Macedonski, who supported the Eteria, Djuvara remained generally loyal to Vladimirescu; by late May, he was guarding Vladimirescu's personal fortress in Cerneți, unaware that Ypsilantis had kidnapped Vladimirescu and had placed Wallachia under Eterist control. As the Ottoman Army moved in to punish the rebels, Djuvara assisted in what he thought was a common Wallachian–Eterist effort to defend Drăgășani, managing an initial victory as commander of the unified cavalry. On 29 May, he was informed of Vladimirescu's killing by the Eterists, and, enraged by this, left the battle scene.

Though labeled a traitor by Macedonski and others, the Serdar returned to fight for Ypsilantis during the second and final battle at Drăgășani, in June. He accompanied Ypsilantis on his trek toward the Austrian Empire, but stopped with his garrison at Bistrița Monastery, preparing to delay the Ottomans by sustaining a siege. A former Eterist, Sava Fochianos, convinced him to surrender, with his second wife and his three half-Romanian sons, assuring him of Sultan Mahmud II's generosity. He was treated fairly as a prisoner in Bucharest, and later in Silistra, though he was ultimately decapitated, after an elaborate humiliation ritual, in Istanbul; it is unclear whether his direct descendants outlived the massacre of his army, but he was survived by a collateral branch, which preserved control of Giuvărăști.

== Biography ==
=== Immigration and war on Jianu ===
Djuvara, who signed his name in Greek, was an immigrant to Romanian-inhabited Wallachia. His place of birth was Ioannina, capital of an eponymous subdivision of the Ottoman Empire; his brother, known locally as "Gheorghe", had remained behind in Macedonia. Sources disagree on their ethnicity, suggesting either "Albanian", "Greek", or "Aromanian" (also rendered as "Macedo-Romanian"). The latter variant is preferred by genealogist Elena Diaconu-Monu, who sees Diamandi as descending from the Pindus Aromanians, which include armatoles mentioned in ballads as doi frați Giuvară ("two brothers Giuvară"). She regards all records of the Djuvaras as "Greeks" and "Albanians", as well as their one-time mention as "Bulgarians" by polemicist Constantin Sion, as misguided or ignorant attempts in defining their actual status as "Romanians from south of the Danube". She also believes that the oldest identifiable Djuvara was a Nicolo Giuvara, who, according to local tradition, was also the first one to settle in Wallachia.

Born into the Christian faith, Djuvara was nevertheless a bigamist. He never divorced his first wife, who, like him, originated "from the land of Ioannina". He also had a "wife taken from Wallachia", with whom he had three young boys by 1821. His initial activities as officer of the Arnauts, and his reception into the boyardom, relate to Phanariote Prince Caradja. One report suggest that he was originally ennobled as a Paharnic, a position which allowed him to collect large sums of gold, at a time when the princely treasury was short on bullion. He exchanged his reserve in for land in Romanați County, where he established his own village and manor, eponymously known as Giuvărăști. For a while, he engaged in tax farming in Dâmbovița County. Caradja made him Serdar (or more specifically, Cârc-Serdar, "commander of the posses") in an effort to curb brigandage in Oltenia. An 1880s historical novella by N. D. Popescu-Popnedea, which builds on historical records published by Grigore Tocilescu, suggests that the Romanați peasants had grown hostile to Caradja and his taxmen, preferring instead to validate a protection racket run by the Oltenian Iancu Jianu.

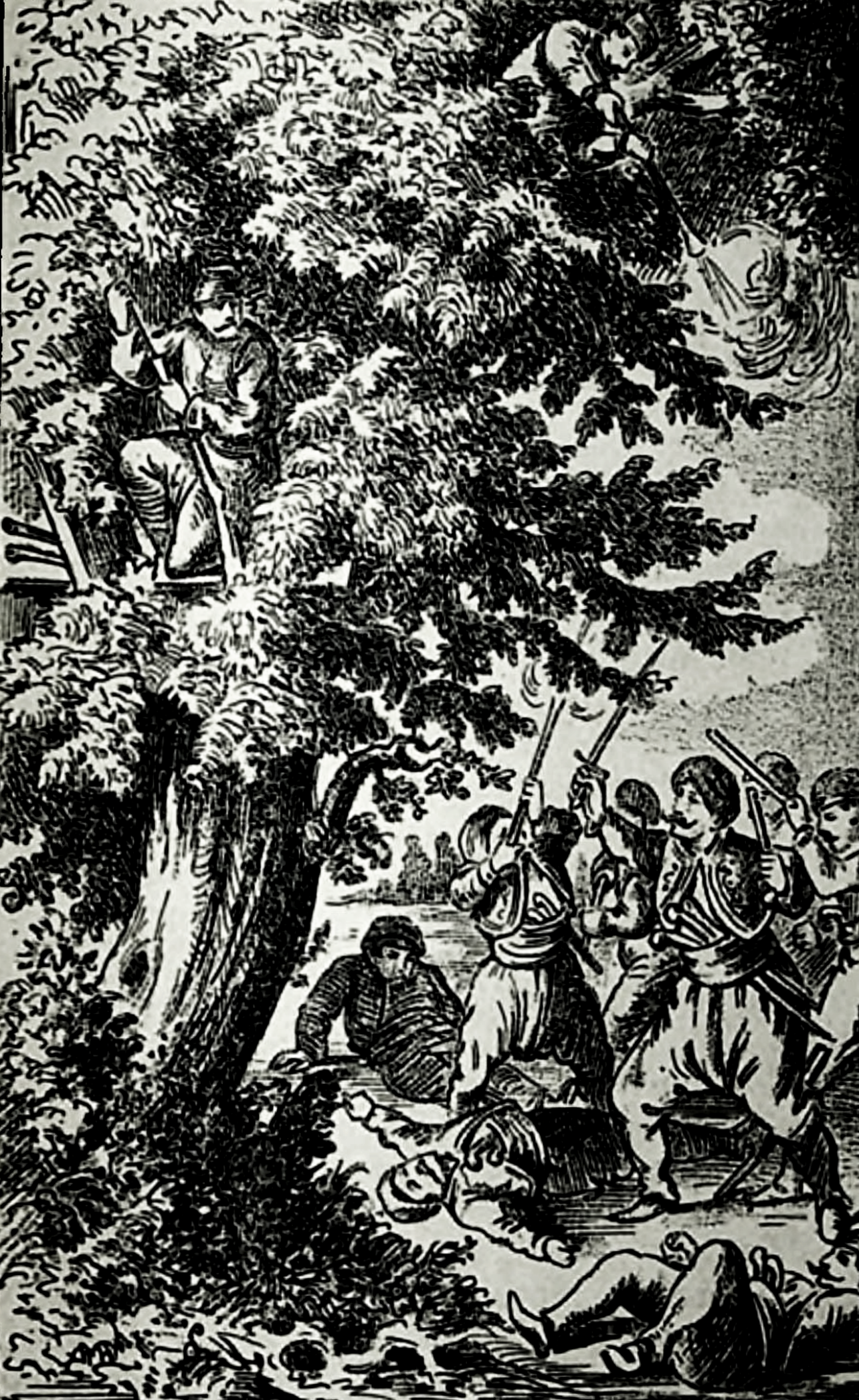
1887 illustration of Iancu Jianu's skirmishes with the Arnauts: Jianu ambushing the Serdar Stoica outside Drăgășani

According to Popnedea, Djuvara, who was "old friends" with Jianu, owed his promotion to Fochianos, the Arnauts' general (or Binbashi). It was Fochianos who had fired the previous Serdar, Stoica. Legend has it that Jianu's conversion into an outlaw (hajduk) only began when he was framed for theft, and that "Iamandi" and his Arnauts were immediately sent in to apprehend him; they failed to track him into the dense forests, where he always had the advantage of terrain. As noted by historian Matei Cazacu, Djuvara's "stubbornness" in this pursuit only allowed him to capture one of Jianu's acolytes. In fact, he had a major role in apprehending two of Jianu's allies, namely Nikola Abraš (or "Iabraș") and Receb Ağa. According to Romanian folklore, the former was mentally frail, but still managed to escape Djuvara's dedicated pursuit, until the final stakeout in November 1816. This action was done only once Caradja had afforded his Serdar "extraordinary means" of combat, placing him in command of 119 peasant soldiers (ruptași). He still employed a ruse, promising to sit down for negotiations with Abraš, and then betraying the implicit honor code; he had Abraš and all his deputies shot, then decapitated, sending their heads to be put up on display in Bucharest. Allegedly, he also took hold of his enemy's loot, and preserved it for himself. This method was also employed on Receb, a Romanian Muslim who had fled with his men from the island of Ada Kaleh and was harassing the Wallachian military forces in Oltenia. According to historian S. I. Gârleanu, Djuvara betrayed Receb's confidence, promising him safe passage, but then ambushing and killing him.

As recounted by Popnedea, Jianu's brothers Amza and Radu, who opposed him politically and were "zealous Graecophiles", repeatedly wrote to Djuvara, asking him to negotiate terms of surrender with Iancu. The two figures met each other at an inn outside Brâncoveni or Strejești, where they discussed the issue. They then cooperated with each other on capturing two Bulgarian brigands who were terrorizing the villagers of Prundu, but Jianu was instantly put off upon witnessing the Serdar's "utterly inhumane torture" of his prisoners. He escorted Jianu to Bucharest, presenting him to Caradja. The Prince refused to honor any previous agreement by his Serdar, and ordered Jianu to be detained at the salt mines in Telega. The hajduk managed to escape, and returned to lead his bands in Oltenia. On 10 April 1817, Djuvara issued, and upheld, another safe conduct for him. One of Caradja's decrees, dating from June 1818, expresses displeasure at learning that Diamandi's men were robbing the peasants under their protection, and instructs the Great Banship of Craiova (placed under a Caimacam) to mete out punishments for this insubordination.

Djuvara managed to preserve his standing after Caradja's own departure from Wallachia. Newly appointed as Prince in January 1821, Alexandros Soutzos continued to battle the brigands of Oltenia. A Romanian officer, Ioan Solomon, reportedly managed to distinguish himself in skirmishes at Goicea. According to his own recollections, he was rewarded with the boyar's rank of Sluger, but Soutzos vetoed his appointment as Serdar—until being made to change his mind by Romanian anti-Greek boyars, including the titular Great Ban, Grigore Brâncoveanu. These men informed the Prince that Djuvara had no accomplishments, and had in fact joined in the plundering of Oltenia. A part-secret Wallachian census, which sought to determine the number of scutelnici (tax-exempt subjects), shows Djuvara as owning two villages in Romanați: Giuvărăști (which was home to 40 families, placed under Pârcălab Mihăilă), and, close to it, Mozolea (with 69 families, under Pârcălab Niculcea).

=== 1821 revolution ===
Writing months after Soutzos' death, Austrian consul Franz von Fleischhackl recalled that Djuvara, alongside Giorgakis Olympios and Yiannis Pharmakis, had served as the Prince's bodyguard, all the while answering to Russian diplomat and spy Alexander Pini. As argued by historian Ioan C. Filitti, this information may substantiate that Djuvara was involved with the Filiki Eteria society, which was conspiring to begin the Greek War of Independence on Wallachian soil, and that he helped liquidate Soutzos, who was not in line with Eterist goals. The war, which ultimately began from neighboring Moldavia, was twinned with a Romanian peasant-and-burgher uprising, instigated by Oltenia's own Tudor Vladimirescu. Local Eterists endorsed Vladimirescu; Djuvara, meanwhile, was called upon by the Wallachian Boyars' Divan to crush the revolutionary movement—a note attributed to Pini informs that he was in southern Romanați when the order came. A receipt of 20 February 1821 confirms that he had received 2,555 thaler and supplies for his 300 Arnauts from the Wallachian Vornic, Constantin Samurcaș. Four days later, another receipt confirmed his additional budget of 7,731 thaler.

As recalled by Vladimirescu's scribe Ioniță Dârzeanu, Djuvara initially took a force of "some hundred armed men" to Craiova, the Oltenian administrative center, where he joined up with his former rival Solomon—the latter had been made garrison commander by the Oltenian boyars. According to modern historian Apostol Stan, their combined force mainly consisted of infantrymen, or Pandurs. This was also the case with Vladimirescu's army: "Hence, at the end of January 1821, there were two military forces in Oltenia, both of them decisively manned by Pandurs, and opposing one another." In early February, the Serdar was stationed at Țânțăreni in Gorj County, preparing for a confrontation with the rebels. With 150 of his albanezi și panduri ai stăpânirii ("Albanians and Pandurs of the court"), Djuvara made his way to Motru Monastery, which was being besieged, and threatened with complete destruction, by rebel troops under Dimitrie Macedonski. Detailed reports suggest that he attacked Macedonski with some success, capturing seven rebels and killing four others; this situation changed when Vladimirescu diverted the bulk of his troops to assist Macedonski.

In the aftermath, Djuvara successfully negotiated safe passage for the two Divan members, Ștefan Bibescu and Barbu Viișoreanu, allowing Macedonski to take Motru. He then reportedly signed a secret pact with Vladimirescu, "swearing him fealty" just shortly ahead of Solomon, who did the same. More publicly, he proclaimed that he would not fight Vladimirescu, moving swiftly to Craiova. He and his men took control of Sfânta Treime Church, which became their strong point. The Divan was not aware of the implications: in a 10 February letter to Scarlat Callimachi, who had been designated Prince but had still not reached Bucharest, legislators describe "Serdar Iamandi" as still engaged in quashing the rebellion; they also note that his presence had failed to reassure Craiova's boyars, who were leaving the city, and whose delegations had asked the Ottomans to intervene militarily. In late February, the Divan was finally informed by its spies in Craiova that the Arnauts at Țânțăreni had been seen embracing the rebels and heard shouting that "they're all brethren" (sunt frați cu toții).

Djuvara fully switched sides, as one of the boyars integrated into Vladimirescu's army and political apparatus—specifically, he was the Ispravnic for Romanați. This also made him one of Vladimirescu non-Wallachian captains—a category which also includes figures such as Macedonski, Olympios, and Hadži-Prodan. In parallel, Macedonski and Djuvara established a direct line of contact with the Eterist leader Alexander Ypsilantis, who was leading his Sacred Band into northern Wallachia, and moving in toward Bucharest. In or around 6 March, Djuvara led his Arnauts into Slatina, where Vladimirescu was amassing his forces for his final storming of Bucharest. On 10 March, he and Nicolae Gigurtu were dispatched to Ipotești, in order to secure the road to Craiova—and also to determine if the Ottomans were preparing to strike in Wallachia.

On 4 April, Preda Drugăneanu, who commanded over the Pandur garrison in Drăgășani, sent a letter to Djuvara, whose location was not specified. In it, he asked the Serdar to hunt down the Ceauș Iovancea, who had gone rogue and was acting as a hajduk around Pitești (Iovancea was not apprehended). On 30 April, a letter received by merchant Hagi Ianuș noted that Djuvara had returned with his men to Giuvărăști, but only for a few days. The author, Konstantinos Nikolas, argued that, unlike Olympios, Djuvara was a protector of trade. The same author reported that Djuvara's grown-up son, who was running a cattle-trading business along the Olt River, was preparing to leave for Austrian Transylvania with his entire herd. Djuvara Sr is also known to have made a brief return to Craiova, where he reportedly confiscated pistols from an absentee boyar. According to Austrian sources, Djuvara eventually followed Vladimirescu to Bucharest, but, on 7 May, presented his homage Ypsilantis, and thus rallied with the Sacred Band. The same reports suggest that "Serdar Diamandi" wished to obtain control over the fortified Cozia Monastery from the peasant army, but that Vladimirescu could not be persuaded to cede any land in southern Wallachia to the Eterists. Around 10 May, he was in Caracal, where a conflict had been brewing between the Wallachian Greeks and Romanians. Eyewitness Stergios Hristodoulou notes that he warned Greeks to travel with him; this advice was ignored by Nikola Kouloglou, who was then killed and robbed by Romanian assailants.

By late May, Vladimirescu's movement had fallen out with the Eteria: the Eterists had arrested Vladimirescu, with Macedonski promoted as leader of the Wallachian force—the part which was still formally allied with the Eteria. Djuvara had been assigned by Vladimirescu to guard his personal fortress, located outside Cerneți; he was entirely unaware of his master's fate. The country was now governed by Ypsilantis, who dug in awaiting the Ottoman response. The Ottoman Army invaded soon after; Djuvara, like Hadži-Prodan, Macedonski, Solomon, and Chiriac Popescu, remained active alongside the Greeks in the effort to stop the invaders. Assisted by an Eterist turncoat, Sava Fochianos, the Ottomans proceeded with an unusually violent repression against the Greek rebels and some of the Pandurs. Various documents of the Imperial Russian Army, stationed in Bessarabia Governorate, record news that Djuvara, alongside Hadži-Prodan and Solomon, retaliated by putting to death the Turkish expatriates in Oltenia.

=== Final stand and killing ===
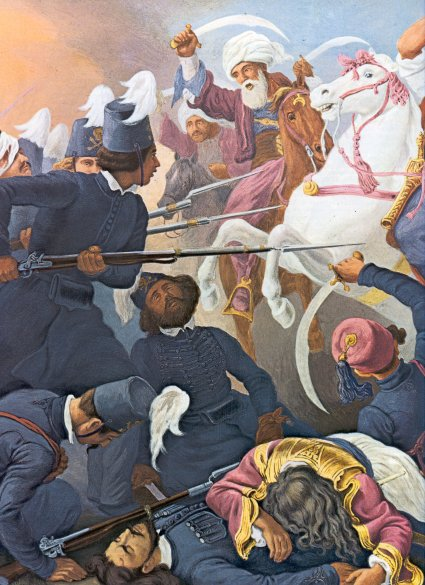
Sacred Band soldiers, in black uniforms, being attacked by Ottoman cavalrymen during the second and final battle of Drăgășani; reconstruction by Peter von Hess

After leaving Cerneți, Djuvara was separated from the core army by Ottoman troop movements, and had to come in through Otetelișu. He was with Solomon and Anastasie Mihaloglu at a makeshift camp in Zăvideni, where they had to deal with the crumbling morale of their soldiers, who insisted on consuming all available wine. During the Drăgășani skirmish of 29 May, which coincided with the early hours of Palm Sunday, the Serdar took charge of the entire cavalry force, numbering some 1,000 men. These drove straight into the Ottoman cavalry squadron, led by Kara Feiz Ali, and managed to scatter it. In his memoirs of the event, Popescu alleges that Djuvara was also the first to withdraw—and that he did so without agreeing to share his stash of saltpeter with the other Wallachians. Historians D. Bălașa and Petre Purcărescu argue that, by noon, Macedonski had confided to Djuvara about Vladimirescu's arrest, which outraged the Serdar, who then ordered his cavalry to desert the field of combat. More generally, Diaconu-Monu observes that there were "social and national" disagreements between the Greeks and Romanians, and that Djuvara could only side with the latter. Stan contrarily argues that Djuvara was interested in joining up with Ypsilantis, rather than in continuing to fight for Macedonski.

Withdrawing in disarray up the Olt, the Sacred Band was inspected by Ypsilantis outside Râmnicu Vâlcea. He asked about the circumstances of their defeat, and was informed by Hadži-Prodan that the Serdar had defected during their muhaserea ("blockade") of Drăgășani. Upon leaving that town, Djuvara had fist occupied Horezu Monastery. Afterward, he made efforts to catch up with Ypsilantis; he was closely pursued by Macedonski, who wanted to avenge the "betrayal" at Drăgășani. Popescu notes Djuvara's presence with the Sacred Band in the second and final clash at Drăgășani. Here too, he was "the first one to withdraw from battle." Ypsilantis took the Eterist leadership on a northward trek into Austria, passing through Cozia; it fell on Djuvara to organize the "most important" of several "centers of resistance".

Various historians, including contemporaries such as Dârzeanu, C. Izvoranu and Mihai Cioranu, suggest that Cozia was Djuvara's last fortress. According to Cioranu, Djuvara consolidated the monastery's outer walls, positioned the two cannons left behind by Ypsilantis, and destroyed a bridge that was crossing the outer moat. Izvoranu also mentions the bridge, noting that its destruction was used by the Ottomans, and by some of their Romanian allies, to isolate him "between two lines of fire", making it impossible for him to follow Ypsilantis' escape route. A 1972 text by Bălașa and Purcărescu notes that this positive identification with Cozia stems from a mistake made by 19th-century researcher Constantin D. Aricescu. According to them, Djuvara was present at Cozia for a very short while, and was then dispatched by Ypsilantis to organize a last stand at Bistrița Monastery, in Vâlcea County; this reading is validated by a November 1821 document. The Serdar became stranded there alongside the remainder of his force—estimates suggest that this comprised as few as 70 Arnauts in all, or as many as 200 Arnauts-and-Wallachians. The church was also a place of refuge for the other Wallachian Djuvaras, but not also for his first wife, whom Diamandi dispatched to Austria.

Bistrița was soon surrounded by troops from the Silistra Eyalet, under the Silahdar—known to historians as either Salih or Selim. Joining the besiegers, Fochianos was assigned to personally handle the Serdar, and pretended to act as an intermediary who offered Djuvara safety in exchange for surrender. As part of this ruse, Fochianos told Djuvara that he would not be indicted for treason: "as a member of Tudor's army since the very beginning, he had never raised arms against the Turks." The garrison surrendered on 20 July, with Djuvara prostrating in front of the Silahdar. The latter continued to deceive his prisoner: he made a show of not allowing him to be lynched by his troops, and then informed him that he would be taken for his protection to Bucharest. Most of the other defenders were probably murdered on the spot, as attested by the 138 human tongues that the Silahdar collected and sent as a gift to Sultan Mahmud II, as well as by accounts which claim that their skins were made into opinci footwear.

Survivors, including civilian refugees and their attending monks, were taken into slavery, and the monastery was thoroughly vandalized. Kethüda Kara Ahmed, as commander of the entire expeditionary forces, received Djuvara in Bucharest, and reportedly did not mistreat him at all. The Djuvaras were chained and dispatched to Istanbul, by way of Silistra; one archival record, summarized by historian Valeriu Veliman in 1981, has it that Ottoman military leaders were genuinely opposed to this move, pleading Djuvara's case with Mahmud. One version of his demise is told by Chriac Popescu, who has it that he and his sons were "slashed by the Turks" in Silistra. A tradition preserved in Romanați suggests instead that the Serdar was hanged there, together with his Romanian wife and his two senior boys, while the youngest was spared and adopted into the Ottoman army.

Djuvara Sr was in fact decapitated in the Ottoman capital, on 14 August. This came after a ceremony that was designed to be both complicated and humiliating: Djuvara watched on as all his adjunct commanders were "slashed" before him, in various markets around Istanbul, being the last victim of this massacre. The Serdar's Romanian widow and all his sons were prisoners of Dervish Mehmed Pasha. According to Cazacu, the latter had them massacred as well. Izvoranu, who records that the boys were aged 12 and 14, recounts that the Pasha had them sent to Istanbul, where they were "hanged" alongside their father. Such accounts are contradicted by Dârzeanu, who suggests that Diamandi's wife and both sons survived, upon embracing Islam. In August 1821, Hagi Ianuș's brother Polychronis complained about the recent arrest of "Tzouvarópoulon" (Τζουβαρόπουλον)—according to historians such as Andrei Oțetea, this may be a reference to one of the Serdar's sons; an 1847 record by the Wallachian Diocese of Râmnic notes that Sărdăreasa Safta a răposatului Diamandi ("Serdaress Safta of the late Diamandi") was still living in Romanați.

== Legacy ==
Sultan Mahmud recorded the news of the Bistrița group's physical destruction with variations of the celebratory phrase Alhamdulillah. A short while after, Dervish Pasha decided to liquidate Fochianos and his Arnauts. In his undated letter to Kara Ahmed, he notes that there was no longer any way to trust Fochianos, as he had been a close associate of "the wicked Diamandi". Chiriac Popescu was also satisfied by the violent turn of events, writing that: "God has swiftly rewarded [Djuvara and his supporters], given their deeds" (au răsplătit lor Dumnezeu fără zăbavă pentru faptele lor). Conservative Romanians similarly celebrated Djuvara's demise, cheering for the Ottomans as restorers of the natural order. This view was expressed in the recollections of a Moldavian eyewitness, Ștefan Scarlat Dăscălescu: Pașa de Vidin [...] a făcut dreptate cu toți cetașii lui Tudor, că i-a spânzurat cu grămada și a curățit țara de hoți și de Arnăuții ce mai rămăseseră supt comanda unui Serdarul [sic] Iamandì Giuvara ("The Pasha of Vidin [...] did justice against all of Tudor's henchmen, in that he hanged them all at once and had this country purged of thieves and of those Aranuts which had endured under the command of one Serdar Iamandì Giuvara"). News of the Bistrița massacre had a large-scale psychological impact, prompting the Eterist garrisons at Tismana and Curtea de Argeș to disband and run across the border into Austrian lands.

Though his own bloodline, at least in Wallachia, was apparently extinguished, Diamandi is remembered as the first Wallachian bearer of the Djuvara name. Giuvărăști continued to be known after its owner, and finally passed to Gheorghe Djuvara, who built the local church in 1857. This Djuvara had three children, of whom one is tentatively identified by Diaconu-Monu as Nițul Giuvara, affiliated with the merchants' guild in Craiova. Gheorghe's inheritors sold the land to Ecaterina Plagino, who held all of it until the land expropriation of 1920; the ruins of Diamandi's manor there were still visible in 1923. Around that time, Iancu Giuvărășteanu, who was a collateral descendant from the original family, had taken residence in the former village school. The name "Djuvara" was by then associated with a political and literary family. Noted for its members Trandafir, Alexandru and Neagu Djuvara, it traced its origins not to Diamandi, but to an Aromanian from Brăila, Iane Giuvara. According to Diaconu-Monu, Iane was Diamandi and Gheorghe's nephew, born to an unattested third Djuvara brother. The Juvaras of Western Moldavia, meanwhile, may descend from Diamandi's cousin, Iane of Ioannina. They include economist Dumitru Juvara, surgeon Ernest Juvara, and Iamandi Juvara, a political notability in Tecuci County.

In his record of the 1821 revolution, Izvoranu mentions Djuvara having been a "very cruel man". Jianu survived his nemesis by decades, boasting in his memoirs (preserved in manuscript form) that he had defeated "that foul-smelling Iamandi" on various occasions; that text also includes the following musing: Cum o putea muierea lui să steie cu puturosul de Giuvara cel nespălat cu anii? ("How come his woman was able to stand by that smelly unwashed Giuvara for years and years?"). Diamandi's memory is preserved in Romanian literature, beyond Popescu-Popnedea. The best-seller Haiducul, a Jianu-themed novel by Bucura Dumbravă, appeared in 1908. In her account, and in the operetta based on it, "Iamandi" is killed off by the vengeful Jianu. Djuvara also appears as a murderous antagonist in Horia Igiroșanu's film project, Iancu Jianu, produced in 1928. According to Cazacu, parts of Serdar Diamandi's life are fictionalized in the deeper narrative layers of Craii de Curtea-Veche, a 1929 novel by Mateiu Caragiale. Specifically, a runaway convict and soldier, who is mentioned as the paternal grandfather of a core character, Pașadia Măgureanu, is loosely based on Djuvara. Another take on the Jianu story, veering from Dumbravă's account, appears in yet another biographical novel, put out in 1940 by Paul Constant.
