= Milcov =

Milcov may refer to the following places in Romania:

Olt County

- Milcov, Olt, a commune in Olt County, Romania
- Milcov (Olt), a smaller river in Olt County

Vrancea County

- Milcovul, a commune in Vrancea County, Romania
- Milcov (Siret), a river in Vrancea County
