= Dacian fortress of Milcovu din Vale =

- Location within Romania
- 44.3855°N 24.3660°E
- Location: Islaz, Milcovu din Vale, Olt, Romania

Site notes
- Condition: Ruined

Monument istoric
- Reference no.: OT-I-s-A-08520

It was a Dacian fortified town.
