= Djuvara =

Djuvara or Juvara is a surname. Notable people with the surname include:

- Alexandru Djuvara (1858–1913), Romanian author and politician
- Diamandi Djuvara (died 1821), Wallachian mercenary in the Ottoman Empire
- Ernest Juvara (1870–1933), Romanian surgeon
- Filippo Juvara (1678–1736), Italian architect and goldsmith
- Neagu Djuvara (1916–2018), Romanian author, historian and philosopher
