= Ulmi =

Ulmi may refer to several places in Romania:

- Ulmi, a commune in Dâmbovița County
- Ulmi, a commune in Giurgiu County
- Ulmi, a village in Belcești Commune, Iași County
- Ulmi, a village in Milcov Commune, Olt County
- Ulmi, a district in the town of Urlați, Prahova County
