= Gavril Istrati =

Moldavian boyar (died 1838)

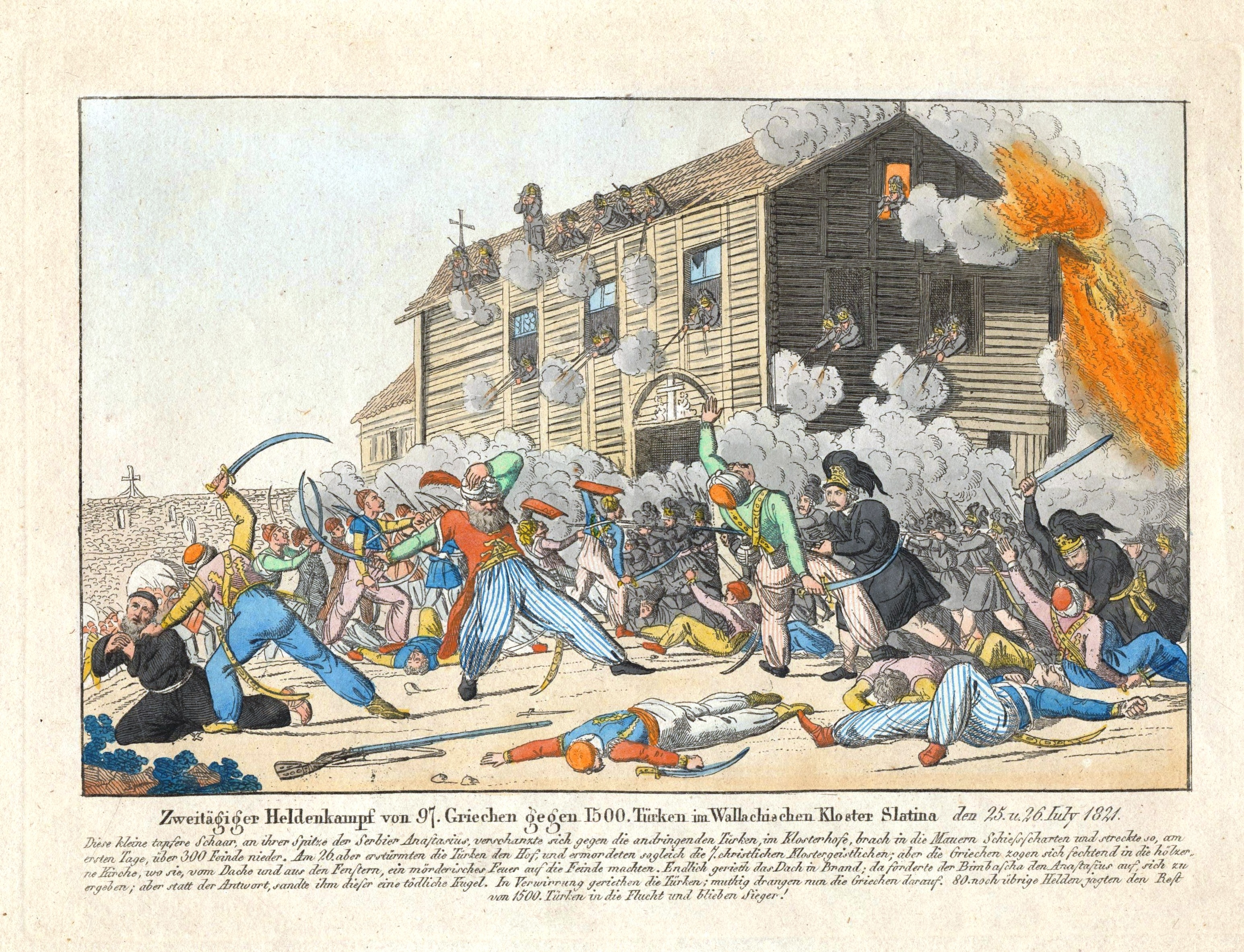
Lithograph of a July 1821 massacre of Sacred Band soldiers by the Ottoman Army at Slatina Monastery—just outside areas loyal to Istrati

Gavril Istrati, or Istrate (died 1838), was a Moldavian boyar who mounted military resistance to the Filiki Eteria during the Greek War of Independence. Probably hailing from the yeomanry, he spent a while servicing the more powerful boyar Teodor "Frederic" Balș, and became a Paharnic in Botoșani city, near Moldavia's border with the Austrian Empire. An exponent of Romanian nationalism and a presumed ally of the Austrians, he participated in the boyar conspiracy which liberated Botoșani County, though his troops disbanded without making further gains; his effort matched a similar counter-rebellion in neighboring Wallachia.

Istrati was shunned by his former co-conspirator Ioan Sturdza, who took over as Prince of Moldavia after the clampdown on Eterism. He spent much of the following decade in Botoșani and Pașcani, and was at some point disfigured during a robbery attempt. Prince Mihail Sturdza reinstated the Istratis to high office, with Gavril carrying on as a Paharnic and Chief Justice in Iași County. He went into retirement in 1836, at the height of the Regulamentul Organic period, with his son Iancu replacing him as judge.

Gavril was also the father of politician and writer Nicolae Istrati, best known as the proponent of conservatism and Moldavian separatism during the United Principalities regime. Through him, the Istratis preserved their connections with Austria into the Crimean War and after. Another son, Manolachi (Meletie) Istrati, embraced a career in the Moldavian Orthodox Church, but assisted Nicolae in his intrigues. The brothers' agenda acquired a visual representation in monuments they erected at Rotopănești. Gavril's grandchildren also had careers in the justice system of the Romanian Kingdom, while a great-grandson, Edgar Istratty, was a noted opera singer.

== Biography ==
The Istratis, who belonged to the middle stratum of Moldavian boyardom, claimed descent from Eustratie Dabija, who had occupied the Moldavian throne in the 1660s; as noted by genealogist Ștefan S. Gorovei, this should be regarded as "entirely unjustified", since Dabija only had one child, a daughter, who "died very young". Other accounts suggest that they were yeomen (răzeși), with Gavril and his brothers, Constantin and Iancu (or Ioniță), being the first Istratis to receive boyar titles and manorial estates. All three began as Captains of the Moldavian administration in Botoșani County. From this position, Gavril became titular owner of Coșuleni village. Researcher Petronel Zahariuc notes that the family origin is ultimately obscure, but that Gavril may have been born to a landowner from Tamași, Grigoraș Istrati, or to the Orthodox priest Ioniță Istrati of Săucești and his wife Ilinca (a widower by 1807). His social advancement was helped by his marriage to Ecaterina (or Catrina) Ilschi, who was related to the leading boyar houses of both Moldavia and neighboring Austrian Bukovina. Her sister Ileana (died 1813) was the wife of Vornic Gheorghe Tăutu, and mother of the "famous Comis Ionică Tăutu".

In 1806, Istrati had joined the retinue of Moldavia's Spatharios, Teodor "Frederic" Balș. Some three years later, in the latter half of 1809, he was disgraced and had to flee after being blamed for the fire that destroyed Balș's townhouse in Iași. From the early 18th century, Moldavia and Wallachia (the Danubian Principalities) had been placed under a tighter control by the Ottoman Empire, exercised through the Greek-speaking Phanariotes. A Romanian by birth, Gavril reached political prominence in 1814 or 1815, when he was made Paharnic of the Moldavian court. In 1816, he was also a Stolnic, and, by 1820, was registered among the tax exempt nobility of Botoșani. The following year, Alexander Ypsilantis' Eteria sparked the fight for Greek independence by invading Moldavia from the Russian Empire, chasing away its titular Prince, Michael Soutzos. Even before his takeover of Iași, he was met with the refusal of many boyars to even recognize him. A delegation was sent to İbrail, openly asking for the Ottoman Army to intervene and chase out the Eterists. Following this, a false rumor spread that the Ottomans had entered Moldavia, and this helped coalesce boyar resistance.

Along with other Romanian and Phanariote boyars, Istrati also rejected offers to collaborate with the new regime—as noted by chronicler Manolachi Drăghici, Botoșani and the entire Upper Country were under very loose Eterist control, as Ypsilantis feared exposing his troops to an Austrian attack from Bukovina. The city had preserved a small Ottoman outpost, whose soldiers got along well with the Romanian, Jewish and Armenian population, though they persecuted Greeks; it was overpowered by a 100-strong portion of the Sacred Band, which celebrated its victory by assaulting Jews and publicly decapitating an Ottoman soldier, whose blood was consumed by the Eterists in a mock version of the Eucharist.

Drăghici reports that Istrati then took to the border village of Zvoriștea, where he secretly met with a boyar assembly that planned military resistance; other conspirators included his boss "Frederic" Balș and his nephew Ionică Tăutu, Vornici Ioan Sturdza and Gheorghe Cuza—alongside Hatmani Răducanu Ruset and Costachi Cerchez, and Spatharios Petrachi Sturdza. They assembled a 3,000-strong peasant army from villages along the Siret, gathered under a plain red flag, the "symbol of war and killing." Historian Nicolae Iorga argues that these "counter-revolutionary" troops were financed and armed by Austria, whose government was upset by Ypsilantis' connection with the Russians. Noting that the boyars themselves were motivated "exclusively" by Romanian nationalism, he draws a parallel with the Pandur uprising in Wallachia, which also culminated as a war with the Greeks. Scholar Pompiliu Eliade contrarily believes that the movement, "patriotic as it was in appearance", rested on conservatism, and represented "the progress of corruption under the [Phanariote] regime"; the aristocracy feared Ypsilantis as an usurper of their privilege, and resented the fact that he himself demanded to be served like a Phanariote Prince.

The guerilla force, led into battle by Istrati and Ștefanachi Gherghel, took Botoșani by storm, disarming the Eterist guard and appointing Petru Vârnav as the city Ispravnic. The remaining Greek garrison abandoned the Upper Country and regrouped in Țuțora; they attempted to cross into Russian Bessarabia, but refrained from doing so when Eterist commander Pendidekas threatened to execute all deserters. Istrati and Gherghel camped out at Stâncești, where a new boyar gathering was convened. They awaited reinforcements and new orders, but none came, and the army simply scattered, with peasants returning to their villages. Eliade suggests that, "although they had some trouble distinguishing between their many oppressors", the peasants "understood very well that, whatever the movement's outcome, they would be the only ones to suffer." However, as argued by Iorga, the boyars themselves had been informed that Ypsilantis could not expect Russian backing, and therefore that the Eterists were doomed (see Battle of Sculeni).

Istrati backed Balș as the loyalist candidate for the Moldavian throne, but "Frederic" failed to act in time for also winning the Ottomans' favor. Phanariote rule was brought to an end when Vornic Sturdza took over as Prince; this regime probably repressed the Istratis, with Gavril being kept out of office for the duration; he compensated by leasing a lucrative estate in Pașcani. As noted by historian Petronel Zahariuc, in 1823 he "felt threatened", and for this reason sent his wife and children to Crasna, over what was then the Austrian border. Around that same time, his home was invaded by robbers, who absconded with much of his currency and other goods. He attempted to resist, and narrowly escaped death after being shot in the face: "his whole face was burned and for this reason he was left with black marks on his cheek [but] had quite the luck, since the buckshot went right past his head, having had the time to push the pistol away with his hand."

The boyar ascendancy was itself curbed by the Russian occupation of 1829. At this stage, Gavril helped his son Iancu enter the Moldavian administrative apparatus as a Postelnic in direct service to the Imperial Army. The Russian takeover gave way a Russian–Ottoman condominium, with both Principalities placed under a new constitutional regime, called Regulamentul Organic. A new Prince, Mihail Sturdza, reappointed Gavril as a Paharnic, and assigned him Chief Justice of Iași County, where he would serve until 1836. Istrati died in 1838; his widow Ecaterina became a nun at Agafton Monastery, where she remained until her own death, at some point in the late 1840s. She was probably joined there by her daughter, Safta Istrati, who is later known to have resided at Agapia.

The Paharnic and his wife also left three sons, of whom the eldest, Iancu, was his immediate successor as Iași County Judge, in which capacity he helped to quell peasant unrest. A client of the court potentate Nicolae Șuțu, he took the additional title of Ban as a reward for his services. He remains mainly known for his activity as a landowner in Călimănești-Tutova. In the early 1830s, he and his brother Nicolae (or Neculai) Istrati had a shared interest in the promotion of literature, penning manuscript versions of Voltaire's Memnon, from the translation done by Costache Negruzzi. The Botoșani census of 1832 recorded that Gavril and Nicolae were living together; by then, Manolachi, known as "Agachii", was already a monk.

== Posterity ==
Nicolae Istrati, originally a tax collector among the Romani slaves, entered political life in the late 1830s. A prominent supporter of Romanian nationalism and a pupil of George Bariț, he was a contributor to journals such as Albina Românească, Dacia Literară, and Foaie pentru Minte, Inimă și Literatură. This Istrati embraced radical liberalism in 1846, when he joined up with Alexandru Ioan Cuza's Patriotic Association, conspiring against Regulamentul and Prince Sturdza. The latter ordered his detention in Galați stockade, with both his brothers intervening to obtain him better conditions while condemning his actions. Just before the Moldavian Revolution of 1848, his was being held at Slatina Monastery, where Manolachi was the Hegumen. Genealogist and polemicist Constantin Sion claims that he was in reality spying for Sturdza and the Russians. A brochure circulated at the time suggested that Nicolae repudiated the revolutionary movement, although its authenticity remains disputed. In 1851, Manolachi became Bishop of Huși, replacing Sofronie Miclescu, who had advanced to Metropolitan of Moldavia. Under the new name of "Meletie Istrati", he is remembered as the founder of a theological seminary that came to be managed by Melchisedec Ștefănescu.

During the final months of Sturdza's reign, Nicolae was promoted to Spatharios. Following the Crimean War, Cuza's National Party came to endorse a union between Moldavia and Wallachia. In early 1856, Nicolae signed up to this agenda, but immediately after embraced Moldavian particularism, then separatism, with "surprising ostentation and mounting fury." However, he still framed his opposition in patriotic terms, arguing that union went against the consensus of European powers, and would therefore lead to an international punitive action against Moldavia; he also claimed that, if at all workable, the union would accelerate Moldavia's social and economic decline. He aired these concerns in his political newspaper Nepărtinitorul, which he published in cooperation with Aga Mihail Străjescu. Together with his son, known as Titu or Titus Istrati, and his brother Meletie, he founded in 1856 the Orthodox church of Rotopănești, which carries a dedication to Moldavian liberties and hosts a statue personifying the country. Nicolae embarked on a massive cultural project, creating Rotopănești's art gallery, music conservatory and theater, alongside several schools. These include Moldavia's first ever school for girls, created in 1855.

During December, Caimacam Teodor Balș reshuffled the Moldavian cabinet, and Nicolae took over as Postelnic—or Minister of Public Works. Though favored by Austrian envoys to Moldavia, he could not obtain an appointment as head of Internal Affairs, as that job was reserved for more high-ranking boyars. The Istrati brothers were by then directly involved in polemics with Metropolitan Sofronie, whom they tried to coax or coerce into an anti-unionist stance. When Sofronie refused, Meletie was groomed by his brother to take over as Moldavia's religious leader—but died before this could happen. As an associate of Gheorghe Asachi and a subordinate of Balș's replacement Nicolae Vogoride, Nicolae played a direct part in falsifying the election of July 1857, resulting in his marginalization after the results were overturned. Before the repeat elections of 1858, he made a final attempt to channel peasant support for the separatist agenda by unilaterally introducing land reform on his Rotopănești estate.

The Postelnic died in infamy in 1861, soon after the creation of the United Principalities; however, he achieved posthumous recognition for his work as a poet and humorist. Shortly before the establishment of a Romanian Kingdom, Titu Istrati was a judge in Botoșani. He rallied with Junimea society, and later with the National Liberal Party. Following a January 1888 election, took a seat in Chamber for Vaslui County. He later moved to the appellate court of Galați, serving as auditor during the local election of 1907. His son was Edgar Istratty, an opera bass and raconteur. Through Iancu and his wife Elenco Adamachi, Gavril had half-Greek grandchildren: Teodor (or Histodor), Nicolae Iancu, and Catinca. Both of the former were jurists, with Nicolae once serving as Romania's Prosecutor General.
