= Istrati =

Istrati is a Romanian surname. Notable people with the surname include:

- Alexandre Istrati (1915-1991), Franco-Romanian painter
- Constantin Istrati (1850-1919), Romanian chemist and physician
- Gavril Istrati (d 1838), Moldovian boyar
- Panait Istrati (1884-1935), Romanian writer
