= Milcov (Olt) =

Milcov Urlătura
- Location within Romania

Location
- Country: Romania
- Counties: Olt County

Physical characteristics
- Mouth: Olt
  - location: Milcovu din Vale
  - coordinates: 44.3862°N 24.3497°E
- Length: 17 km (11 mi)
- Basin size: 13 km^{2} (5.0 sq mi)

Basin features
- Progression: Olt→ Danube→ Black Sea
- River code: VIII.1.169

The Milcov or Urlătura is a left tributary of the river Olt in Romania. It flows into the Olt in Milcovu din Vale near Slatina. Its length is 17 km (11 mi) and its basin size is 13 km^{2} (5.0 sq mi).
