= Iancu Jianu =

Romanian Hajduk (1787–1842)

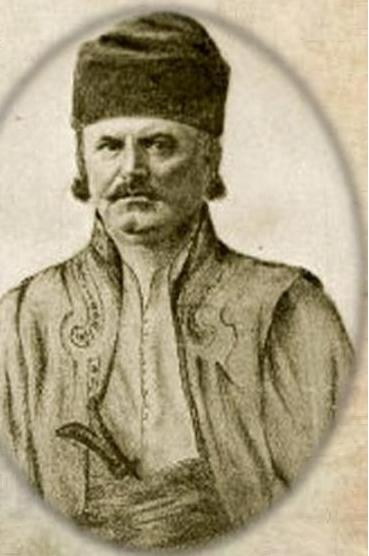
Iancu Jianu

Iancu Jianu (Romanian pronunciation: [ˈjaŋku ʒiˈanu]; 1787 – 14 December 1842), also Ioniță Jianu, was a Wallachian Romanian hajduk.

== Biography ==
Born in Caracal, Oltenia, Wallachia, in 1787, to the Jianu boyar family, as the youngest of four brothers. His father, Costache Jianu, was a paharnic and an ispravnic of Romanați County.

Despite being rather wealthy, owning parts of four estates and 14 gypsy slaves, he chose to become an outlaw, opposing the idea that the leadership of the country was given to Phanariotes instead of the local boyars. According to Petre V. Nasturel, what made him become a hajduk was a tax collector (zapciu) who enforced the collection of due taxes while Iancu was away. On his return, Iancu killed the tax collector and became a runaway.

He organized a band of outlaws, which numbered 20–25 people, but usually used smaller groups of 10–12 people in his interventions. In 1821, he brought to the army of Tudor Vladimirescu just 21 people. The first known document mentioning Jianu as a hajduk is from 6 May 1812, when a report of the Great Spătar mentioned two groups of outlaws in Romanați County, among them being the one of Jianu.

In the following months Jianu and a part of his hajduks were caught, and on 30 December 1812 the new voivode of Wallachia, Ioan Gheorghe Caragea, ordered to the ispravnics of Romanați to hand them over to Bucharest where he was sent to prison, but following his relatives' intervention he was pardoned. Iancu continued his robberies in Romanați and Dolj counties, and his brother, Amza Jianu, had to deposit at the treasury a sum of 1833 thalers which were supposed to compensate those robbed by his brother.

On 10 April 1817, Caragea wrote a letter to the Caimacam of Craiova which said that he is pardoned for all his misdeeds, but if he ever repeats his acts, he would be hanged as soon as he is caught. Nevertheless, Iancu returned to his life as an outlaw, he was caught and sentenced to death by hanging. Iancu was saved by an old custom, according to which a man sentenced to death is pardoned if a noble woman asks him to become her husband and he accepts. Sultana Gălășescu, a young woman from the retinue of princess Ralu, wanted him to become her husband. After the marriage with Sultana, Iancu gave up being an outlaw and retired to his estate from Fălcoi.

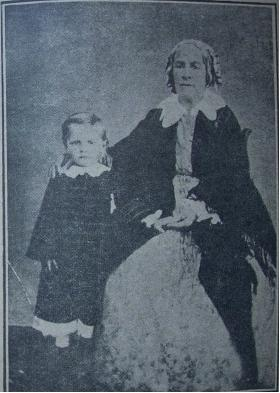
Sultana, Jianu's wife with her nephew, Iancu Dobroveanu

During the 1821 Wallachian Revolution, he and his old hajduk band enrolled in Tudor Vladimirescu's Pandur army. Being named pandur captain, in April 1821, together with Stolnic Borănescu, he was sent to Silistra, to try to convince the Mehmed Selim Pasha to give up the intervention against Tudor. However, he was arrested, being freed only in August 1821, after Tudor's army was repressed.

Returning to Wallachia, Jianu settled in Chilii, a hamlet near Caracal. He was briefly arrested in 1823 under the accusation of trying to conspire against the authorities, but he was freed soon. In 1837, he was an underruler of Olteț plasă. Iancu had two children: Marița, born 10 August 1830, and Zinca, born 24 May 1835. He died on 14 December 1842 and was buried the next day at the cemetery of the Biserica Maica Domnului (Church of the Lord's Mother) from Caracal, but in 1910, his remains were moved to the Caracal Cemetery, being buried next to his wife, who died in 1869.

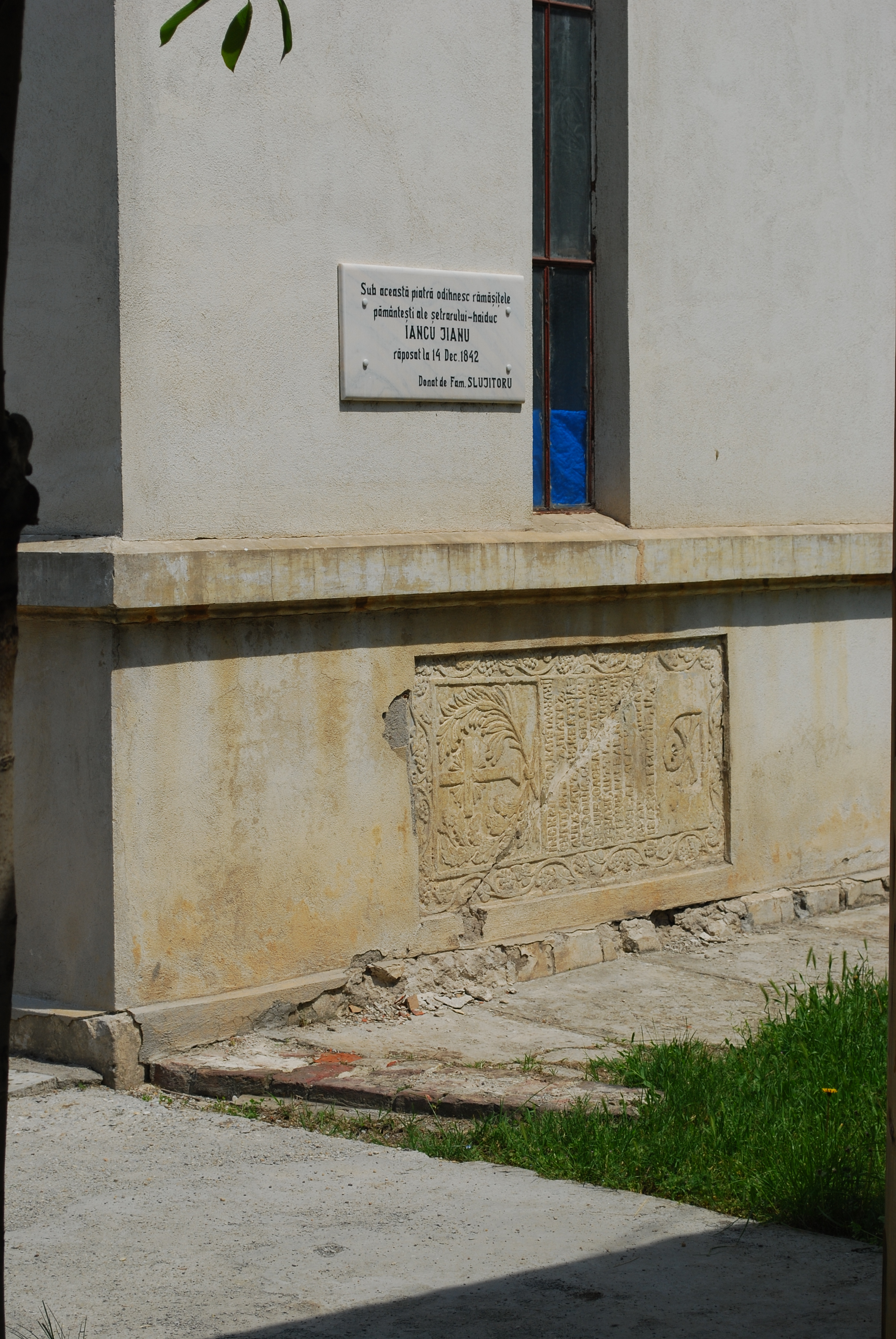
Jianu's tombstone in Caracal

== Legacy ==
Iancu Jianu is remembered in many folk stories and ballads, such as Jianul, a folk balad written down by Vasile Alecsandri.

His house in Fălcoi was restored by architect R. Mariani, being transformed in 1959 in a museum under the name Memorial House Iancu Jianu. The commune of Cepturoaia in Olt County was renamed in 1953 in his memory Iancu Jianu, Olt.

There were three Romanian movies inspired by his life:

- IMDb: Iancu Jianu (1928)
- IMDb: Iancu Jianu, zapciul (1980)
- IMDb: Iancu Jianu, haiducul (1981)
