= Nicolae Șuțu =

Romanian economist (1798–1871)

Nicolae Șuțu (1799 – January 20, 1871) was a Romanian politician.

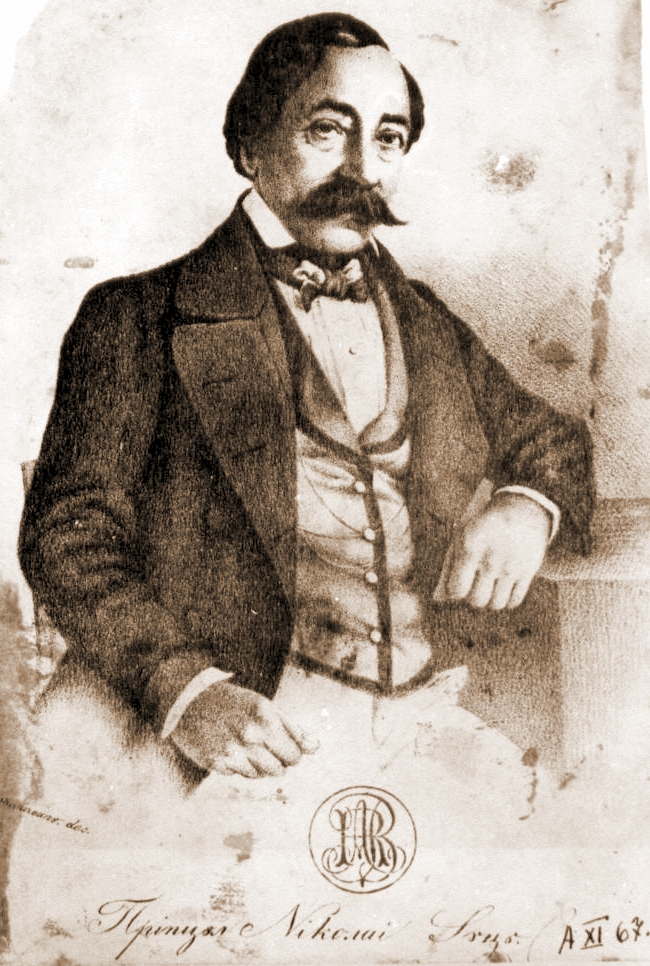
Portrait of Nicolae Șuțu

Born in Istanbul into the Phanariote Soutzos family, he left the Danubian Principalities for Imperial Austrian-ruled Transylvania during the Wallachian uprising of 1821. He later returned to Moldavia, becoming a state secretary under the Russian administration of Pavel Kiselyov, although he steadfastly refused naturalisation. Șuțu was subsequently minister in various departments during the rule of Prince Mihail Sturdza. By 1838, he was representing Sturdza in Bucharest.

Șuțu published various economic studies, including Statistica Moldovei (1850), which appeared in French, Greek and Romanian. After the Russian occupation of the Principalities in 1853, the Russian President Plenipotentionary, General Budberg, nominated him to serve on Moldavia's Administrative Council.

He died in Focșani.
