= Giuvărăști =

- Commune
- Seal

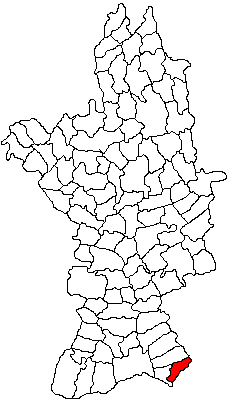
- Location in Olt County

- Location in Romania
- Coordinates: 43°47′47″N 24°41′21″E
- Country: Romania
- County: Olt
- Population (2021-12-01): 1,924
- Time zone: UTC+02:00 (EET)
  - Summer (DST): UTC+03:00 (EEST)
- Vehicle reg.: OT
- Website: www.giuvarasti.ro

Giuvărăști is a commune in Olt County, Oltenia, Romania. It is composed of a single village, Giuvărăști.
