= Dimitrie Macedonski =

Wallachian Pandur captain and revolutionary leader

- Born: 1780 or 1782; Ottoman Macedonia
- Died: 10 January 1843; Bucharest, Principality of Wallachia
- Occupation(s): politician, captain, revolutionary
- Organization: Wallachan battle fields (1821)

Dimitrie Macedonski (c. 1780 or 1782–1843) was a Wallachian Pandur captain and revolutionary leader.

== Life ==
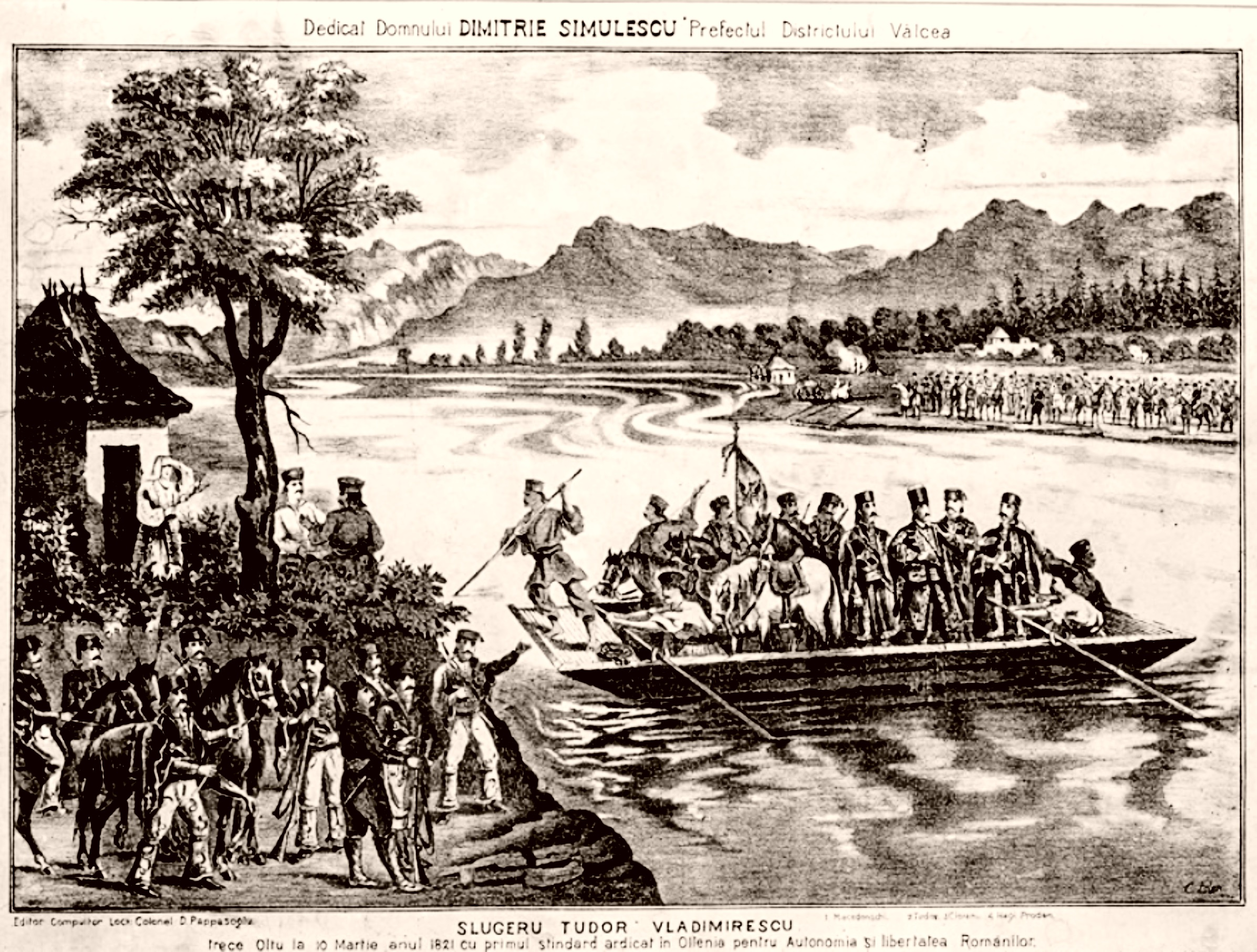
Pandurs crossing the Olt River at Slatina, on May 10, 1821. The four men standing at the front of the barge are, from the left: Macedonski, Tudor Vladimirescu, Mihai Cioranu, and Hadži-Prodan. Lithograph by Carol Isler

Dimitrie was born in Ottoman Macedonia, as the son of Stoyan Mincho (Stogiannis Mintsos), a local chieftain. After the Russo-Turkish wars in the late 18th century the family of Mincho emigrated beyond the Danube. Dimitrie joined the Russian army and became a military officer. He adopted the surname "Macedonski", which referred to his home place. According to the Romanian historian Radu Florescu Dimitrie was of Bulgarian origin. Per Romanian historian Constantin Velichi he acted as a Bulgarian in the period 1806-1821, but after 1840 he was already Romanianized.

Macedonski volunteered in the Russo-Turkish War (1806–1812). Afterwards, he was awarded for his bravery and gained the rank of lieutenant.

Later he held different administrative positions in Wallachia and Moldavia.

Taking part in the Wallachian uprising of 1821, alongside fellow Serbian commander Hadži-Prodan, he was appointed Tudor Vladimirescu's lieutenant by boyar allies of the revolutionaries, on January 15. Sympathetic to the Philikí Etaireía and suspicious of Vladimirescu's level of commitment to the cause, Macedonski, together with Giorgakis Olympios and Iannis Pharmakis, deposed and arrested the rebel leader.

Macedonski was also involved in revolutionary agitation in 1840 Wallachia as a member of a radical conspiracy led by Mitică Filipescu and Nicolae Bălcescu. On April 9, 1841, he was sentenced to eight years in prison, and held at the Snagov Monastery, where he fell ill with dropsy. In early 1843 he was transferred to the Plumbuita Monastery near Bucharest for medical care, but he died on January 10.

He was the grandfather of Romanian poet Alexandru Macedonski.
