= Yiannis Pharmakis =

Greek revolutionary leader (1772–1821)

Yiannis Pharmakis Ιωάννης Φαρμάκης
- Born: 1772; Vlasti, Macedonia, Ottoman Empire
- Died: 1821 (aged 48–49) Constantinople, Ottoman Empire
- Allegiance: Greece
- Conflicts: Greek War of Independence

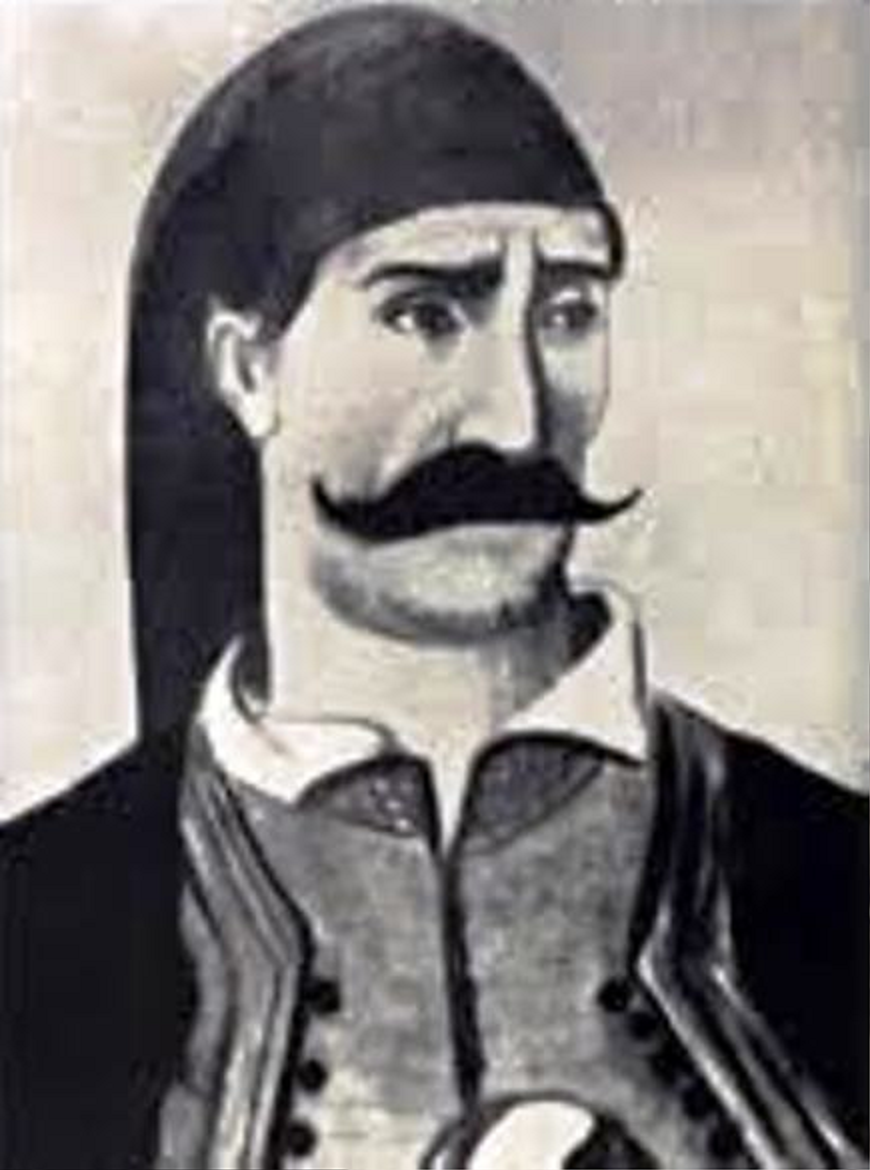
Ioannis Farmakis.

Yiannis Pharmakis or Ioannis Farmakis (Greek: Ιωάννης Φαρμάκης) (1772–1821), born in Vlasti, Macedonia (Greece), was a Greek revolutionary leader of the Greek War of Independence, active in Wallachia and Moldavia.

Initially a commander of the Princely guard in Bucharest, Pharmakis joined the Philikí Etaireía movement and became an aide to Alexander Ypsilantis, establishing a permanent link with the non-Greek Oltenian Pandurs led by Tudor Vladimirescu. He and Giorgakis Olympios reached an agreement with Tudor in the early months of 1821, but, since the relation between the two factions soured as an effect of Russian and Ottoman Empire intervention, the two (joined by Dimitrie Macedonski) decided to arrest Vladimirescu (who was to be executed on June 7). As the insurgency crumbled under Turkish attacks, Pharmakis retreated to the Secu Monastery in Neamţ county, organising his last stand together with 380 to 500 of his men. Eventually he and his officers surrendered under conditions of general amnesty but the Ottoman troops captured and sent them to Constantinople, where they were publicly executed in 1821.

His sister Agnija, nicknamed Nula, married Toma Vučić-Perišić, a Serbian politician and military leader during the Serbian Revolution.

== See also ==
- Greek War of Independence
- List of Macedonians (Greek)
- Giorgakis Olympios
- Alexander Ypsilantis
