= Ipotești, Olt =

Ipotești
- Commune
- Location in Romania
- Coordinates: 44°19′N 24°24′E
- Country: Romania
- County: Olt
- Population (2021-12-01): 1,394
- Time zone: EET/EEST (UTC+2/+3)
- Vehicle reg.: OT

Ipotești is a commune in Olt County, Muntenia, Romania. It is composed of a single village, Ipotești. This was part of Milcov Commune until 2004, when it was split off.
