= Prundeni =

- Commune
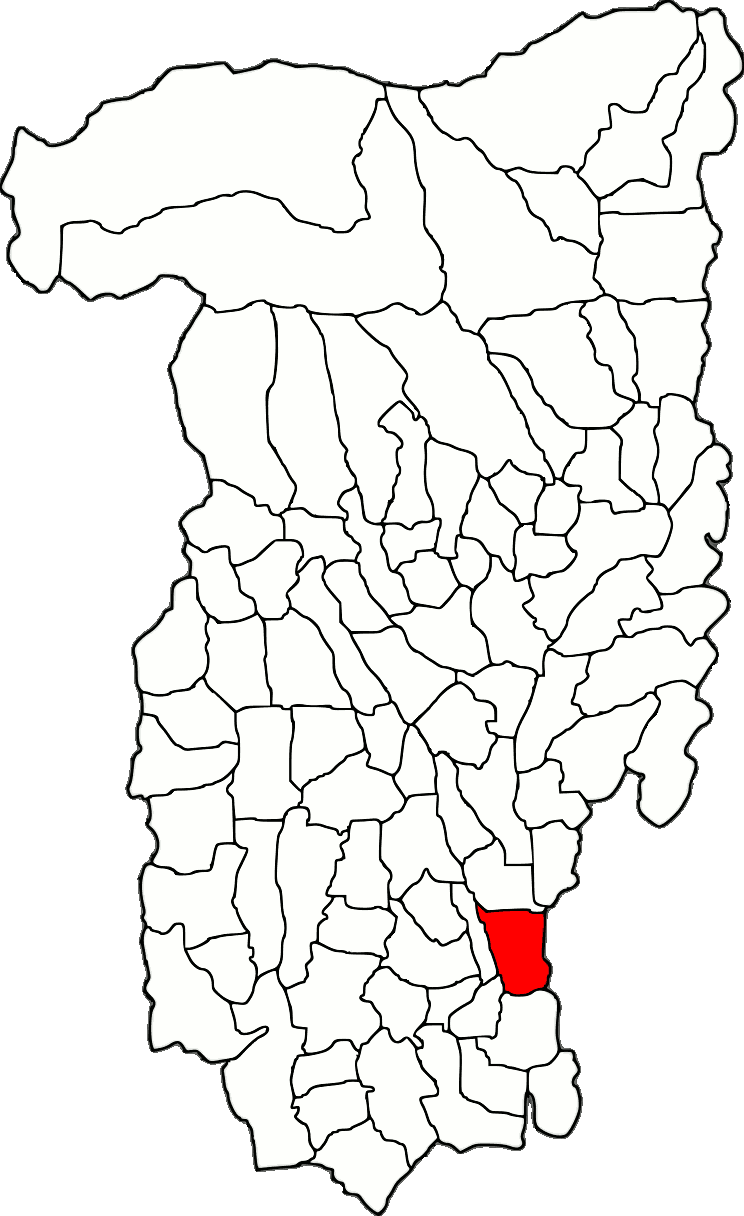
- Location in Vâlcea County

- Location in Romania
- Coordinates: 44°44′N 24°15′E
- Country: Romania
- County: Vâlcea
- Area: 40.98 km^{2} (15.82 sq mi)
- Population (2021-12-01): 3,277
  - Density: 79.97/km^{2} (207.1/sq mi)
- Time zone: UTC+02:00 (EET)
  - Summer (DST): UTC+03:00 (EEST)
- Vehicle reg.: VL

Prundeni is a commune located in Vâlcea County, Oltenia, Romania. It is composed of four villages: Bărbuceni, Călina, Prundeni and Zăvideni.
