= Țânțăreni, Gorj =

Țânțăreni
- Commune
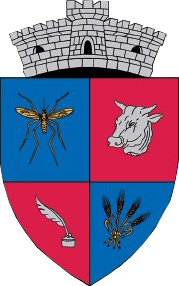
- Coat of arms

- Location in Romania
- Coordinates: 44°36′N 23°29′E
- Country: Romania
- County: Gorj
- Subdivisions: Arpadia, Chiciora, Florești, Țânțăreni

Government
  - Mayor (2024–2028): Robert Marian Ciutureanu (PSD)
- Area: 45.02 km^{2} (17.38 sq mi)
- Elevation: 118 m (387 ft)
- Population (2021-12-01): 5,197
  - Density: 115.4/km^{2} (299.0/sq mi)
- Time zone: UTC+02:00 (EET)
  - Summer (DST): UTC+03:00 (EEST)
- Postal code: 217535
- Area code: (+40) 02 53
- Vehicle reg.: GJ
- Website: primariatantareni.ro

Țânțăreni is a commune in Gorj County, Oltenia, Romania. It is composed of four villages: Arpadia, Chiciora, Florești, and Țânțăreni.

== Natives ==
- Septimiu Pretorian (1893–1977), brigadier general in World War II
