= Ispravnic =

An ispravnic or ispravnik was, in the Danubian principalities, the title owned by a clerk or a boyar in charge of law enforcement in a certain county. Initially, during the middle ages, ispravnics were people who used to carry out the hospodar's commands. Later on, ispravnics became local administrators and were charged with leadership of local law enforcement.

The same title was used in the Russian Empire.
