= Milcov, Olt =

Milcov
- Commune
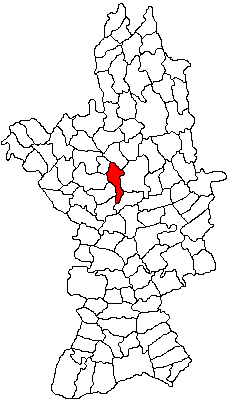
- Location in Olt County

- Location in Romania
- Coordinates: 44.3783°N 24.3851°E
- Country: Romania
- County: Olt
- Population (2021-12-01): 1,595
- Time zone: EET/EEST (UTC+2/+3)
- Vehicle reg.: OT

Milcov is a commune in Olt County, Muntenia, Romania. It is composed of four villages: Milcovu din Deal, Milcovu din Vale, Ulmi (the commune center) and Stejaru. It also included Ipotești village until 2004, when it was split off to form a separate commune.
