= Marițica Bibescu =

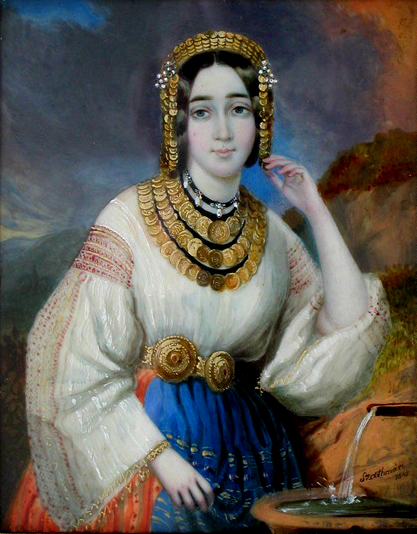
- Carol Szathmari's miniature portrait of Princess Bibescu in Romanian dress, 1845

Princess-consort of Wallachia
- Tenure: September 9, 1845 – June 1848
- Born: August 1, 1815; Bucharest, Wallachia
- Died: September 27, 1859 (aged 44); Paris, French Empire
- Burial: Père Lachaise Cemetery, Paris, France
- Spouse: Gheorghe Bibescu
- Issue: Constanța Rasponi-Murat; Pulcheria Rasponi-Murat; Alexandrina Ghica; Mihai Ghica; Maria de Montesquiou-Fézensac; Elena Bibescu
- House: Bibescu; Văcărescu; Ghica (1834–1845)
- Father: Nicolae Văcărescu
- Mother: Alexandra "Luxița" Băleanu
- Religion: Eastern Orthodoxy

Marițica Bibescu, born Maria Văcărescu, also known as Marițica Ghica (August 1, 1815 – September 27, 1859), was the Princess-consort of Wallachia between September 1845 and June 1848. A boyaress by birth, she belonged to the Văcărescu family. Her father Nicolae, her grandfather Ienăchiță and her uncle Alecu were politicians and professional writers; Marițica herself was an unpublished poet. She was orphaned as a child, but was looked after by her relatives and her family friends, including Prince Alexandru II Ghica and philanthropist Zoe Brâncoveanu. Described by period sources as exceptionally beautiful, if also vain and ambitious, she married in 1834 the Prince's brother, Spatharios Costache Ghica. Her adoptive clan, the Ghicas, remained the leading Wallachian family until late 1842, when Alexandru II was deposed by the Ottoman Empire.

Marițica's influence peaked again after the princely election of 1842–1843. Though her husband failed in his bid for the throne, Marițica became mistress of the winner, Gheorghe Bibescu, bearing him a child. Her third cousin, Gheorghe was at the time married to her godmother Zoe Brâncoveanu. Choosing to ignore public outrage, he finally obtained a divorce in 1844. The following year, he and Marițica were married in Focșani, a town situated on Wallachia's border with Moldavia. This was a lavish ceremony attended by Moldavian Prince Mihail Sturdza, who was their new godfather. Nevertheless, it had only partial recognition from the Wallachian Orthodox Church hierarchy. At odds with Metropolitan Neofit II, Gheorghe appealed to the Ecumenical Patriarch, and obtained approval after replacing Germanus IV with Meletius III. His effort included bribing the Ottoman Divan to depose Germanus.

Policy disagreements between the conservative Gheorghe and liberal groups fed the Wallachian Revolution of 1848. During these events, Marițica remained by her husband's side, and was possibly present when he survived an assassination attempt. The couple eventually escaped Wallachia and settled in the Austrian Empire; the revolution was crushed by the Ottoman and Russian Empires, and the throne was handed to Marițica's brother-in-law, Barbu Dimitrie Știrbei. She and Gheorghe lived in Istanbul, and later in Paris, where Gheorghe continued to press for his recognition as Prince, as well as for union between Wallachia and Moldavia. His political career in Wallachia was resumed after the Crimean War, but his prospects of becoming Prince were ended during the electoral battles of 1859; his rival, Alexandru Ioan Cuza, was in a position to unite the two countries.

The same year, Marițica died of cancer in Paris. She was survived by five children from two marriages, including a son, Mihai Ghica, who died without heirs of his own, in 1926. Her female descendants married into several houses of European nobility, including Montesquiou, Rasponi-Murat, Courval, and Faucigny-Lucinge. In the arts, Marițica is remembered as a promoter of the Romanian dress, and a muse to painters Carol Szathmari and Constantin Lecca. Also a literary patron, she was the aunt of two other female writers, Elena Văcărescu and Dora d'Istria, as well as the stepgrandmother of poet Anna de Noailles. Marițica's grandson Léon de Montesquiou was a founding member and doctrinaire of Action Française.

== Biography ==
=== Origins and childhood ===
Born on August 15, 1815, in the Wallachian capital of Bucharest, the future Princess was commonly known by the hypocorisms "Marițica" and "Marița". Maria belonged to the Văcărescu family, and thus to the urban boyardom of Wallachia; she was the eldest of several daughters born to Vornic Nicolae Văcărescu and his wife, Alexandra "Luxița" Băleanu. The Văcărescu family legend linked them to the mythical Radu Negru, and also to the Romanian nobility in Transylvania. They portrayed themselves as owners of Făgăraș Citadel, which came to be depicted on their coat of arms—however, this connection remains historically unattested (see Boyar of Fogaras). Their boyar lineage was more likely named after Văcărești in Dâmbovița County, and can only be attested back to the 1570s. During that period and into the 1800s, Wallachia and Moldavia (as the Danubian Principalities) were vassal states of the Ottoman Empire. One of Marițica's ancestors, Negoiță Văcărescu, a Wallachian envoy and hostage to the Sublime Porte, was boiled to death in 1668. Her great-great-grandfather Ianache Văcărescu served under Prince Constantin Brâncoveanu during the Pruth River Campaign, and was executed alongside him by the Ottomans.

Nicolae was an elegiac poet, born to writer Ienăchiță Văcărescu and his third wife, Ecaterina Caragea. According to tradition, Ienăchiță was poisoned in 1797 by Prince Alexander Mourouzis, having allegedly courted Princess-consort Zoe. His other children included Alecu Văcărescu, born to an earlier wife, Elena Rizo. Himself a poet and social critic, Alecu died mysteriously in 1799, after having been singled out for repression by Prince Mourouzis. He left a son, Iancu (Ioan) Văcărescu, who was also a noted poet. Through this connection, Marițica was aunt of the fashion journalist Claymoor and great-aunt of writer Elena Văcărescu. Through grandmother Ecaterina, Marițica descended from the Caradjas, a prominent family of Greek Phanariotes; her great-grandfather was Nicolae Caradja, who served as Wallachian Prince in 1782–1783.

Although her father had a congenital hunchback, which prompted him to live in relative seclusion, Marițica became a Wallachian belle, described in contemporary sources as "jewel-like" and "blonde like a seraph". As noted by scholar Constanța Vintilă-Ghițulescu, her beauty standards reflected 19th-century conventions, which valued sedentary lifestyles: diarist Nicolae Golescu commented that she was "quite plump and quite gentle". Various records also note that, like her paternal family, she had a talent for writing poetry; her work remains unpublished. She spent some of her childhood abroad, forced out by the revolutionary unrest of 1821. The Văcărescus escaped into the Principality of Transylvania (part of the Austrian Empire), finding temporary refuge at Corona (Brașov). They later returned to Wallachia, but Nicolae died soon after, possibly while making a return trip to Șcheii Brașovului. Luxița still lived in Corona in 1826, when she attempted to settle her husband's debts by mortgaging her land in Băneasa.

=== Ghica marriage ===
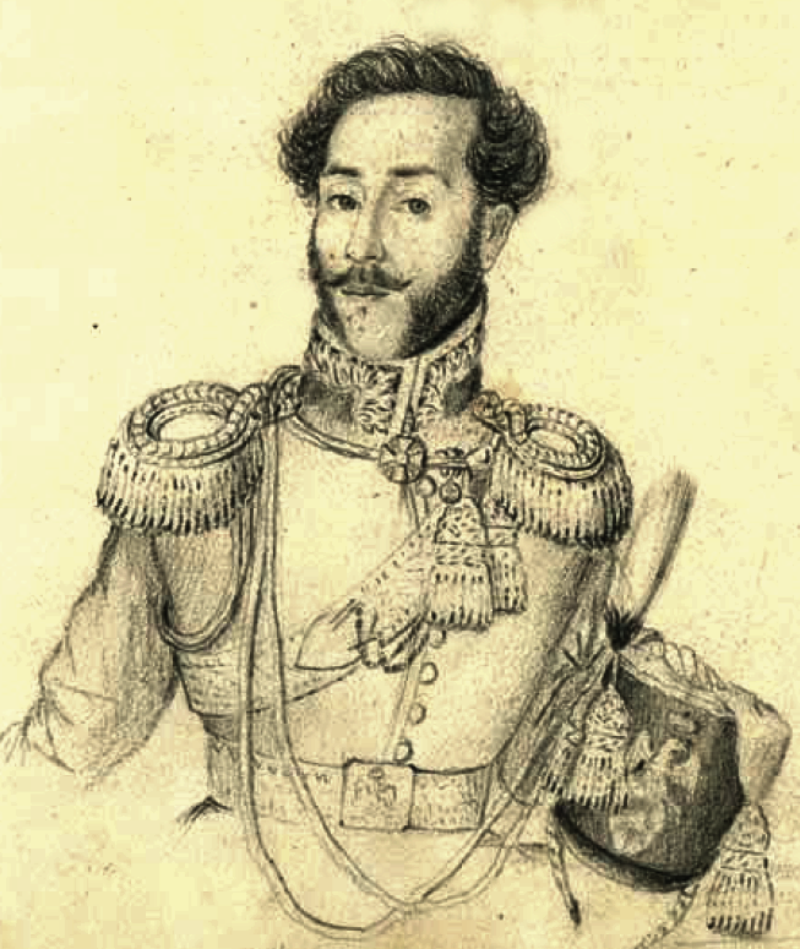
Marițica's first husband, Costache Ghica, in an 1831 drawing by Constantin Lecca

The Russo-Turkish War of 1828 signaled a Westernizing epoch for the Danubian Principalities. Both countries remained under Ottoman suzerainty but were directly governed by the Russian Empire. This Regulamentul Organic era, which increased the prestige of lesser boyars, allowed the orphaned youth to focus her efforts on social climbing. A first-hand witness to her matrimonial ascent, Colonel Grigore Lăcusteanu mentions her "superlative pride". Her "vanity" and "unbound cupidity" were noted by the memoirist I. G. Valentineanu, while historian Constantin Gane portrayed her as "quite ambitious". Marițica's first husband was Costache Ghica (1797–1852), a member of the powerful Ghica family. Their wedding took place in Bucharest, on July 29, 1834. Reportedly, it had the blessing of the Băleanu family, but not of Luxița herself.

This arrangement also made her the sister-in-law of two Wallachian Princes: Grigore IV Ghica, who had reigned in 1822–1828, and his half-brother, Alexandru II Ghica, who took the throne in 1829. The latter pledged himself as the couple's godfather during the wedding ceremony, while their godmother was philanthropist Zoe Brâncoveanu, "one of the richest women in either Danubian Principality." Under his brothers' regimes, Costache had become a Spatharios and Colonel of the Wallachian militia, organized under Russian supervision; he also served terms as Ban (or Caimacam) of Oltenia (1827–1828, 1830, 1838), alternating with his other half-brother, Mihalache Ghica. Mihalache was married to another famous beauty, Catinca Faca-Ghica. The first-ever Romanian woman to have translated an entire book, she was also known for her infidelities, and was for a while the mistress of Baron Üxküll, a Russian hussar. According to writer Cezar Bolliac, Marițica and Catinca were "the most beautiful pair of sisters-in-law that have been graced upon in Bucharest society during this day". Through her connection with Mihalache and Catinca, Marițica became the aunt of another female writer, Dora d'Istria.

The family inhabited an eclectic Ghica manor in Bucharest, located just outside Cișmigiu Gardens. Four children were born to the couple in 1835–1842: daughters Constanța, Pulcheria, and Alexandrina, and son Mihai Ghica. Various period witnesses argue that Costache was unfit for his administrative and military roles, to the point of discrediting his brother's government. French diplomat Félix Colson describes him as "excessively urbane, with the mannerisms of our own dandies; [...] lacking character, petrified in his prejudice, always satisfied with himself". Lăcusteanu owed his military career to Costache, who extended him a paternal protection, virtually adopting him. Nevertheless, in his memoirs he dismisses Ghica as a "non-entity", arguing that actual control over the Wallachian militia was being exercised by a corrupt Russian appointee, Alexandr Banov.

In October 1842, Ottoman Sultan Abdulmejid I issued a firman deposing Prince Ghica. Though the latter accepted the decision and left for Corona, his departure was widely perceived in the country as a tragic event. According to Lăcusteanu, Marițica played a part in the mourning, and fainted from shock in the grand hall of the princely palace in Bucharest. Ghica's toppling was followed by the princely election of 1842–1843. It caused political rifts between members of Marițica's two families. The Spatharios, probably following his wife's advice, announced himself as a candidate. Mihalache Ghica made of point of not casting his ballot; two Văcărescus, Iancu and Teodor, presented themselves as both electors and candidates. During the final stages of the vote, two Oltenian brothers emerged as front-runners: Barbu Dimitrie Știrbei, in second place, transferred his votes to Gheorghe Bibescu, who thus obtained an unchallenged majority and the Wallachian throne.

=== As mistress ===
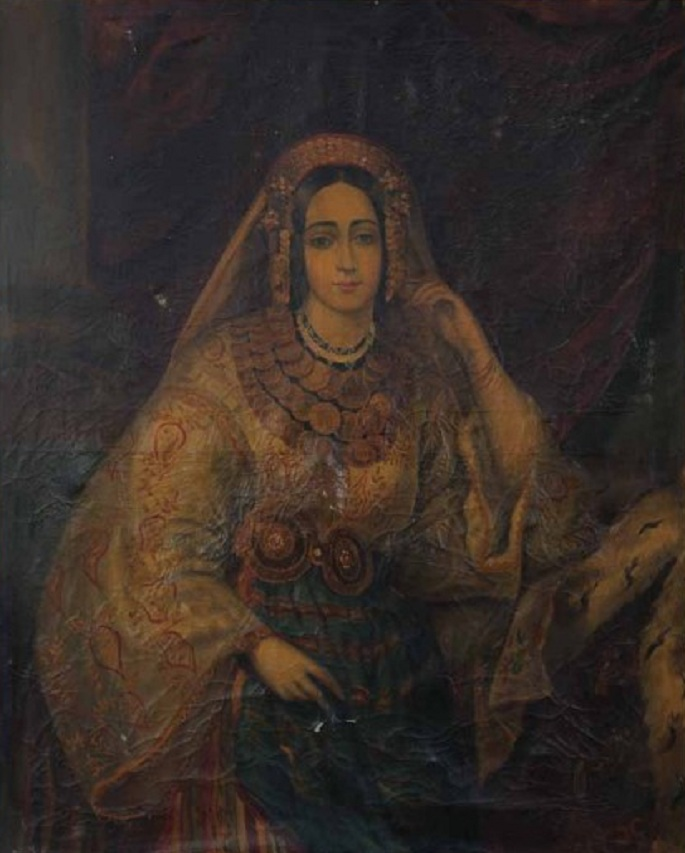
Szathmari's official portrait of Princess Bibescu, ca. 1845

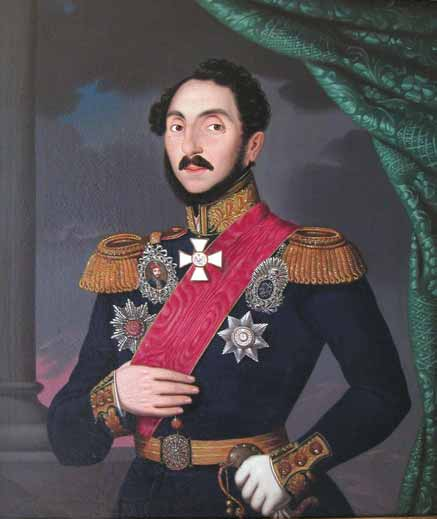
Prince Bibescu in 1844, portrait by Paulus Petrovitz

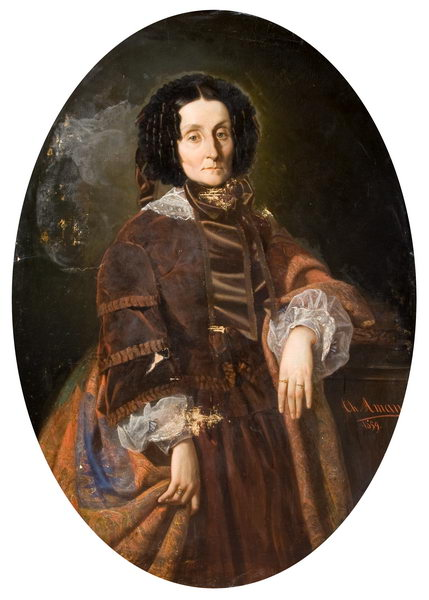
Zoe Brâncoveanu, by Theodor Aman

Through his mother Catinca, the new Prince was also a Văcărescu descendant, and Marițica's third-cousin. He had married Zoe Brâncoveanu in 1826, and had seven children by her. Probably while recovering from the last of these pregnancies, Zoe had developed a mysterious mental illness, which included cyclothymia. Marițica attended Bibescu's coronation ceremony, where she reportedly attracted more attention than the new Prince himself; the latter was also charmed, and declared his intention to have her "give more dazzle to the Wallachian throne". Other sources note that he was competing for her interest with Marquess Chateaugiron, the French Consul, as well as with painter Carol Szathmari.

Eventually, Marițica sued for divorce, following a disclosure that she was Bibescu's lover. The Prince also signaled his romantic involvement by sacking Costache Ghica from the post of Spatharios. Instead, Marițica's uncle Teodor took over as Ban, further signaling the Văcărescu ascendancy. The divorce procedure was already in motion in July 1843, when Bibescu and Ghica had a gentleman's agreement, prompting Ghica to sign a document acknowledging that he was no longer intimate with his wife. She had already moved out of the Ghica manor, and was living at the princely palace. Marițica was widely seen as responsible for pushing Bibescu to divorce from Zoe Brâncoveanu, making her the center of a public scandal. The Prince made sustained efforts and "complicated maneuvers" to arrange his marriage to Marițica, seeking absolution from the Wallachian Orthodox Church and permission from the royal courts of Europe.

The highest ranking Wallachian church official, Neofit II, was a virulent opponent of the new couple. He was joined in this effort by the Ordinary Assembly, over which he presided; its other members became suspicious of Bibescu's attempts to modify the law on dowries. Their counter-proposal was a direct attack on the Prince and his mistress: under this law, adulterous men lost half of their wives' dowries, and were exiled from the country together with their țiitoare ("kept women"). Such proposals were endorsed by the Ghica family, who mounted the opposition in alliance with the Filipescu boyars. Bibescu was shamed into withdrawing his own project, but obtained permission from Abdulmejid to dissolve the Assembly in 1844; until the legislative election of 1846, he ruled as an absolute monarch. Marițica was by then pregnant, giving birth to the Prince's eighth child, and her own fourth daughter. Bibescu had sent her abroad for the delivery, which reportedly occurred at Munich, Kingdom of Bavaria, in 1844.

Eventually, in August 1844, the Ecumenical Patriarchate granted Bibescu his divorce; in October, he declared his former wife clinically insane, and obtained control of her estate, which he shared with courtier Alecu Filipescu-Vulpea. Neofit turned to blocking Marițica's divorce from Ghica, rejecting their application in February 1845. The church tribunal noted that "cold relations between husband and wife" were not a canonical reason for separation—however, Neofit privately confessed that he would have rejected any of Marițica's applications, to get back at the Prince for his dissolving the Assembly. Bibescu responded by appealing to a higher authority, but Patriarch Germanus IV rejected his plea. This left the Prince with only an "extreme measure": he bribed the Ottoman Divan and obtained Germanus' replacement with Meletius III, who signed off on the Ghica divorce. Some reports suggest that Meletius himself had received kickbacks from Bibescu.

=== As Princess ===
Gheorghe Bibescu and Marițica were then married on September 9, 1845, with a lavish ceremony in Focșani, the Moldavian border town. This highlighted the friendship between the two Principalities and thrones: their godfather was the reigning Moldavian Prince, Mihail Sturdza. Marițica sailed down the Danube from Mehadia, where she had followed a beautifying treatment; she was welcomed with gun salutes in all Wallachian river ports, and received at Brăila by a delegation of boyars, including Filipescu-Vulpea—who was by then also her in-law. The religious service was provided by Chesarie Căpățână, the Bishop of Buzău, and performed at Nașterea Sfântului Ioan Botezătorul, a monastery church. Bishop Neofit still disapproved of the marriage, and was therefore uninvited. The ceremony was followed by a gala ball, with music provided by the Austrian conductor Ludwig Wiest and decorations designed by Moldavian architect Gheorghe Asachi; 50,000 locals were reportedly present. In parallel festivities, the new couple acted as godparents for 12 peasant weddings, donating land and cattle to the new families.

Although supporting Romanian nationalism and receptive toward liberalism (including his creation of a customs union with Moldavia), the Bibescu regime alienated the various social classes with its nepotistic habits and especially with its support for a Russian venture capitalist, Alexander Trandafiloff. Liberals were also confident that the Kingdom of France supported Neofit's obstruction of the princely divorce, which hurt Gheorghe and his Russophile tendencies. According to historian Pavel Strihan, the French consul Adolphe Billecocq was "the most unusual victim" of the divorce scandal, recalled by his government for having suggested that Prince Gheorghe was acting reasonably. However, other records suggest that Billecocq and the Bibescus were enemies, and that the recall was owed to embarrassment over Billecocq's other intrigues.

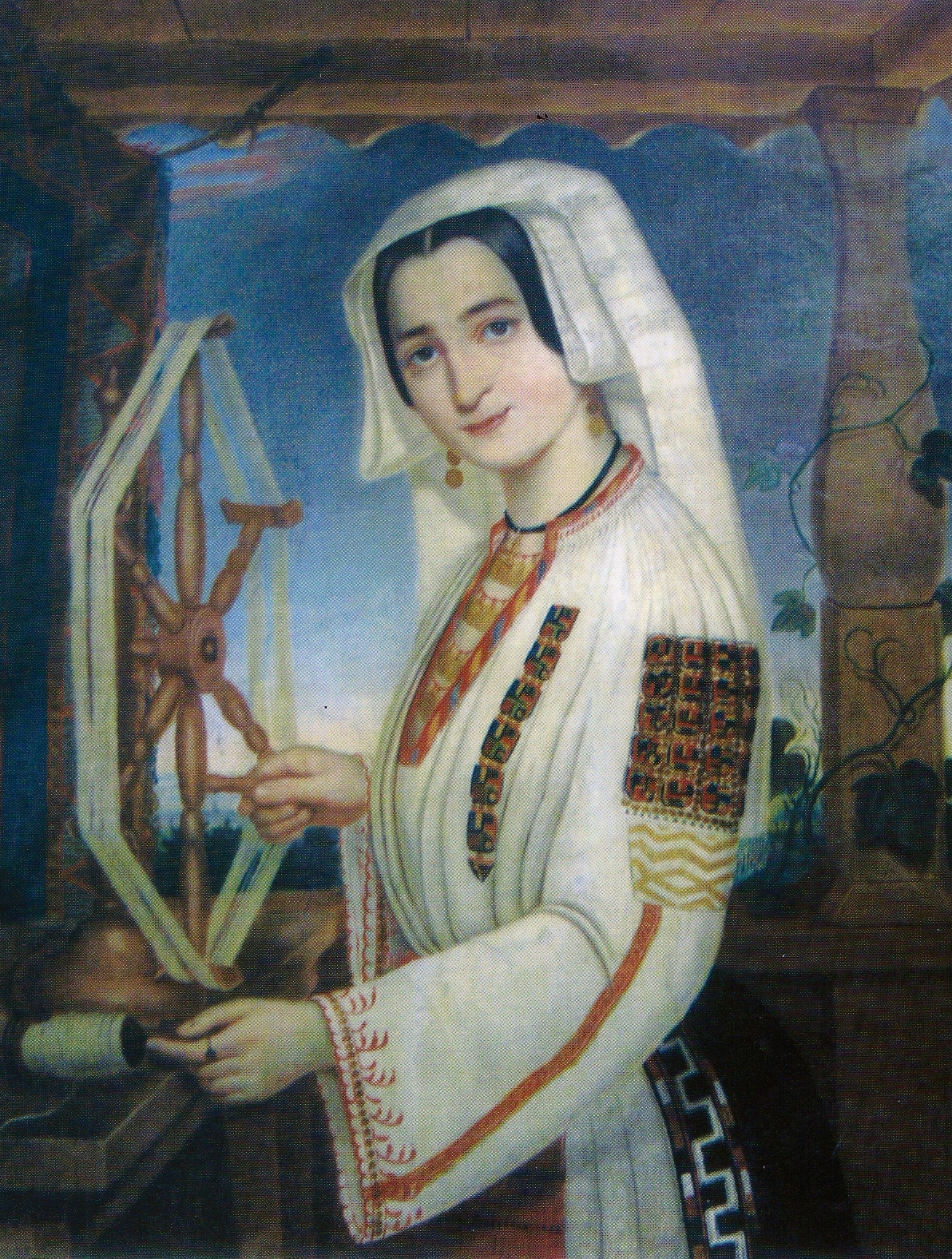
Constantin Lecca's portrait of Princess Marițica, painted in 1849, during her stay at Corona (Brașov)

On the conservative side, Lăcusteanu claims that the overall failures of the Bibescu regime were largely attributable to his young wife's ambitions, which the Prince felt obliged to satisfy. A similar note was made by Austrian general Franz von Wimpffen, who viewed Gheorghe as a weakling maneuvered by his "coquette" wife. Wimpffen argues that such influence also framed the Prince's nationalist, or "Daco-Romanian", projects. According to a letter of protest signed by Wallachia's conservatives, Gheorghe took revenge on Neofit and, by July 1847, left him completed isolated: "Intimidation and corruption have isolated him [...]; he can only shed tears at the plight of his country." The bishop finally agreed to a formal reconciliation and baptized Marițica's adulterous daughter.

Gheorghe celebrated his wife's Orthodox name day on September 8, 1847, with a national festivity. This included the inauguration of a wooden bridge over the Olt River, at Slatina. The Princess toured other parts of the country, and had her favorite residence on the Prahova Valley, at Comarnic. While in Bucharest, she took piano lessons with the Transylvanian composer Gheorghe Simonis, later the brother-in-law of Omar Pasha.

This period of Princess Marițica's life was curbed by an anti-conservative revolution. The opposition was initially peaceful, and issued a Proclamation of Islaz, demanding more rights; it erupted into a more violent revolt on June 9, 1848, when officers Grigore Paleologu and Grigore Pereț shot at Prince Bibescu, who was taking a carriage ride outside Bucharest. They only managed to hit one of Bibescu's epaulettes. Various accounts suggest that Marițica was by her husband's side, though others have it that the Prince was traveling with his favorite minister, Alexandru Vilara. The following day, rebellious militiamen confronted the Prince with imperative requests for a liberal constitution. Though Gheorghe never made this pledge, he took another oath, "on my life and that of Her Highness the Princess", that "no Moskal shall enter this country".

=== Exile ===
Later that month, Gheorghe secretly left the country, leaving Bucharest to be fought over between the Wallachian provisional government and a conservative dissident, Ioan Odobescu. According to Lăcusteanu, the departing Prince was sure that he would be returned to the throne by "the Moskals", who "are set to enter Bucharest in three to four days". Marițica followed her husband into exile, both of them initially settling at Corona. On June 29, another conservative coup in Bucharest briefly established a triumvirate comprising Neofit and two of Marițica's uncles: Teodor Văcărescu and Emanoil Băleanu. All three were captured and expelled over the border with Austria. Eventually, the revolution was dealt with by a two-stage invasion of Wallachia, seeing cooperation between the Ottoman Army and Russian forces, led by Mehmed Fuad Pasha, Abdülkerim Nadir Pasha, and Alexander von Lüders; the only battle was fought over Dealul Spirii in Bucharest.

By June 1849, Gheorghe's brother Știrbei had been appointed Prince by both the Ottoman Empire and Russia, returning Wallachia to conservatism. In August 1849, the Bibescus left Austria and set course for a new home in Istanbul. On their passage through Brăila, they were offered a royal reception and gun salute by Lăcusteanu, who commanded the local garrison; other members of the Lăcusteanu clan joined the former princely couple for the remainder of their trip. Gheorghe established friendly contacts with the exiled revolutionaries; resentful of his brother, he returned to Wallachia as a pretender. He lived in the small town of Măgurele, but repeatedly demanded to be restored ownership of the princely palace, which he viewed as his personal property. Eventually, Abdulmejid ordered him into exile.

In the 1850s, the Bibescus moved to the French Empire. For a while, they were joined there by General Ioan Emanoil Florescu, who had married Zoe's daughter Catinca Bibescu. The former Prince eventually returned to Wallachia after the Crimean War, which curbed Russian influence and placed the Principalities under an international tutelage. He and his brother fought each other to emerge as conservative candidates for the Wallachian throne; Știrbei was initially the favorite. However, shortly before the legislative election of 1857, Gheorghe led his own wing of the "National Party", whose activists supported unification between Wallachia and Moldavia. He then stood as a regular deputy in the ad-hoc Divan, where he proposed an hereditary monarchy under a foreign Prince. He eventually resigned in November 1857, and returned to Paris. At the time, he was upset by the radicalism of the elected legislature.

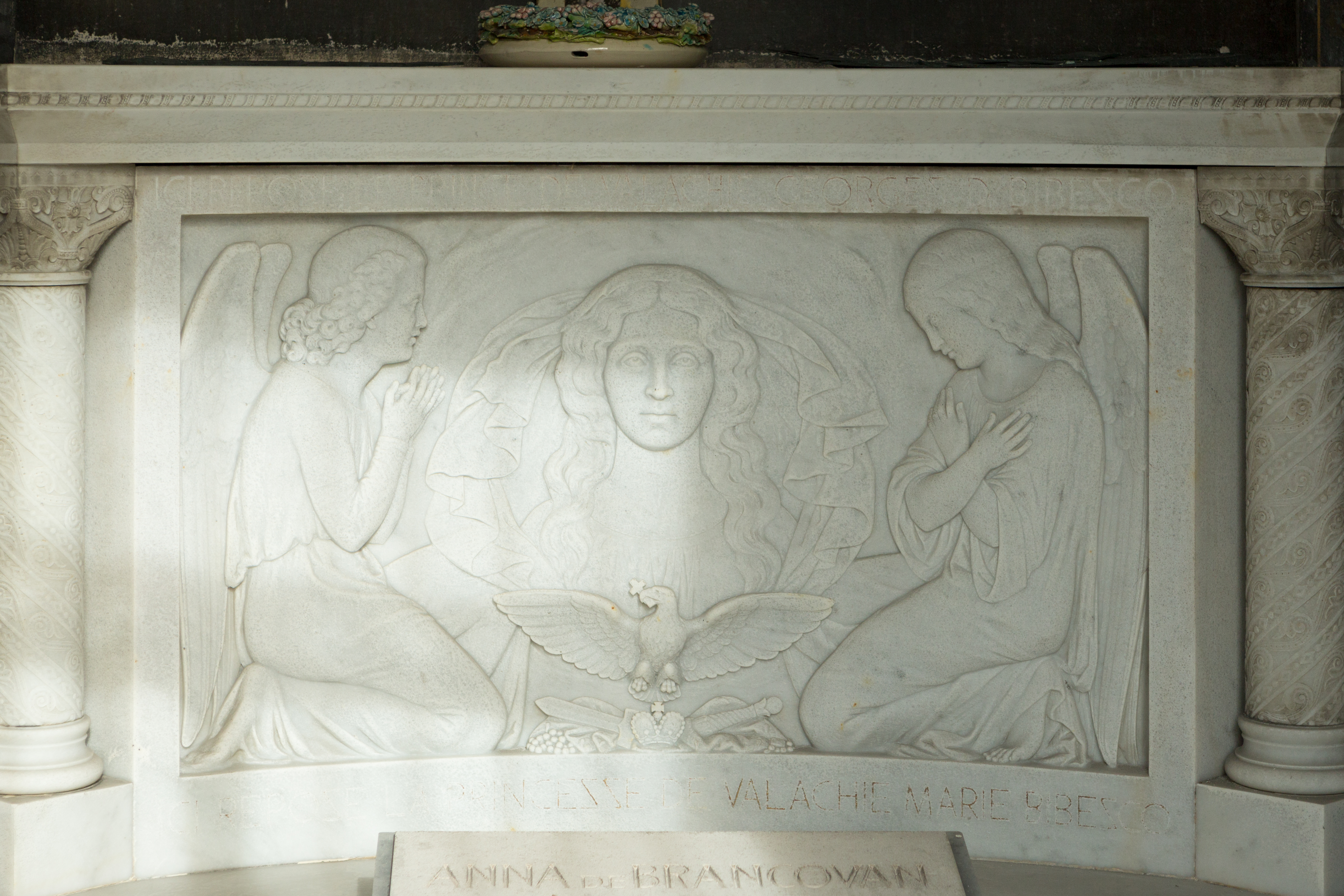
Princess Marițica's portrait on her sarcophagus at Père Lachaise Cemetery. Attributed to Eugène André Oudiné

Before and during the elections of January 1859, Gheorghe and Știrbei were again boyar favorites for the throne, with Gheorghe clearly in the lead before the actual ballot. Marițica's cousin Iancu and her uncle Băleanu were also in the race. On election day, the progressive caucus inside the National Party put up Alexandru Ioan Cuza, who had already won the Moldavian election, as a surprise candidate. Under street pressure, Gheorghe renounced his ambitions, and Cuza emerged as the winner. Marițica did not follow her husband on these enterprises: she fell ill with cancer. She died in Paris on September 27, 1859, months after the Moldo–Wallachian union. Her tomb is located in a Bibescu crypt at Père Lachaise Cemetery.

== Legacy ==
=== Descendants ===
Marițica's first husband had died in early 1852, allegedly consumed by regret over his divorce. Her mother Luxița survived to 1870, when she was aged about 75. The Princess was also survived by Gheorghe (who died in 1873 and was buried at her side) and by his six living children from his marriage with Zoe. Through the eldest of these, Grégoire Brancovan, Marițica was stepgrandmother of poet Anna de Noailles. The second-born, Nicolae Gh. Bibescu, had a military career in French North Africa. Another stepson, adopted by France as "Georges Bibesco", fought with distinction in the Franco–Mexican War of the 1860s, and was awarded the Legion of Honour. He also built the family townhouse outside Les Invalides, with contributions from architect Charles Le Cœur who commissioned decorative arts for the mansion by Auguste Renoir. After a public scandal, he eloped with Valentine Caraman-Chimay, who gave birth to his son, the aviator George Valentin Bibescu. Both Georges and Nicolae had political careers in Romania, eventually emerging as supporters of the Conservative Party.

Following Costache's death, Marițica's Ghica children were adopted by the family of Nicolae Moret Blaremberg. Constanța and Pulcheria were then married into the Rasponi-Murat family, the former to Gioacchino, a direct descendant of Joachim Murat and Caroline Bonaparte. Initially based in the Papal States, at Ravenna, he was also a noted participant in the movement for Italian unification, and served for a while as Prefect of Palermo. He and Constanța had a son, who was cultural attaché in Paris during the 1890s. Pulcheria was the wife of Achille Rasponi, who was cousins with Gioacchino. After caucusing with the unionist movement in Emilia, he served terms in both houses of the Italian parliament. He remained in contact with his Romanian family, exchanging political advice with Știrbei. Given a literary education by her mother, his wife had a writing career of her own, being noted as a collector of Italian folklore. Both sisters were also active philanthropists in their adoptive Romagna: Pulcheria set up an orphanage and assisted cholera patients; Constanța (or Constanza) was a founder of the Italian Red Cross section in Ravenna (April 1888). The sisters died in 1895, within one month of each other.

Together with the Rasponis, Alexandrina and Mihai Ghica inherited Văcărescu land in Oltenița and Frăsinetu de Jos, but this was auctioned off in July 1878. Neither of these two remaining Ghica heirs ever married. Both moved to Paris, where Alexandrina died in 1903. From an extra-conjugal affair with a French officer, she had a son, Maurice Guy, who was the maternal ancestor of Romanian politician Radu Câmpeanu. Mihai, also known as Michel Ghika, died outside his home on Rue Washington, Faubourg-du-Roule, in February 1926; he was aged 87.

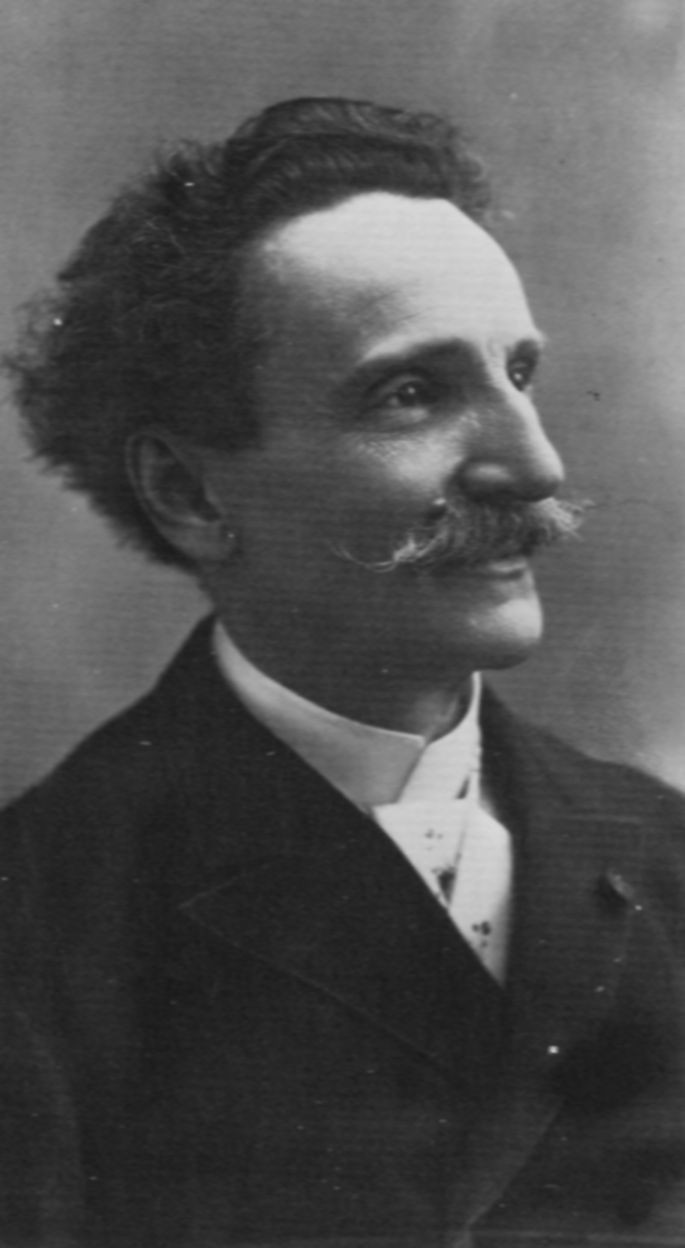
Photograph of Marițica's stepson, Georges Bibesco

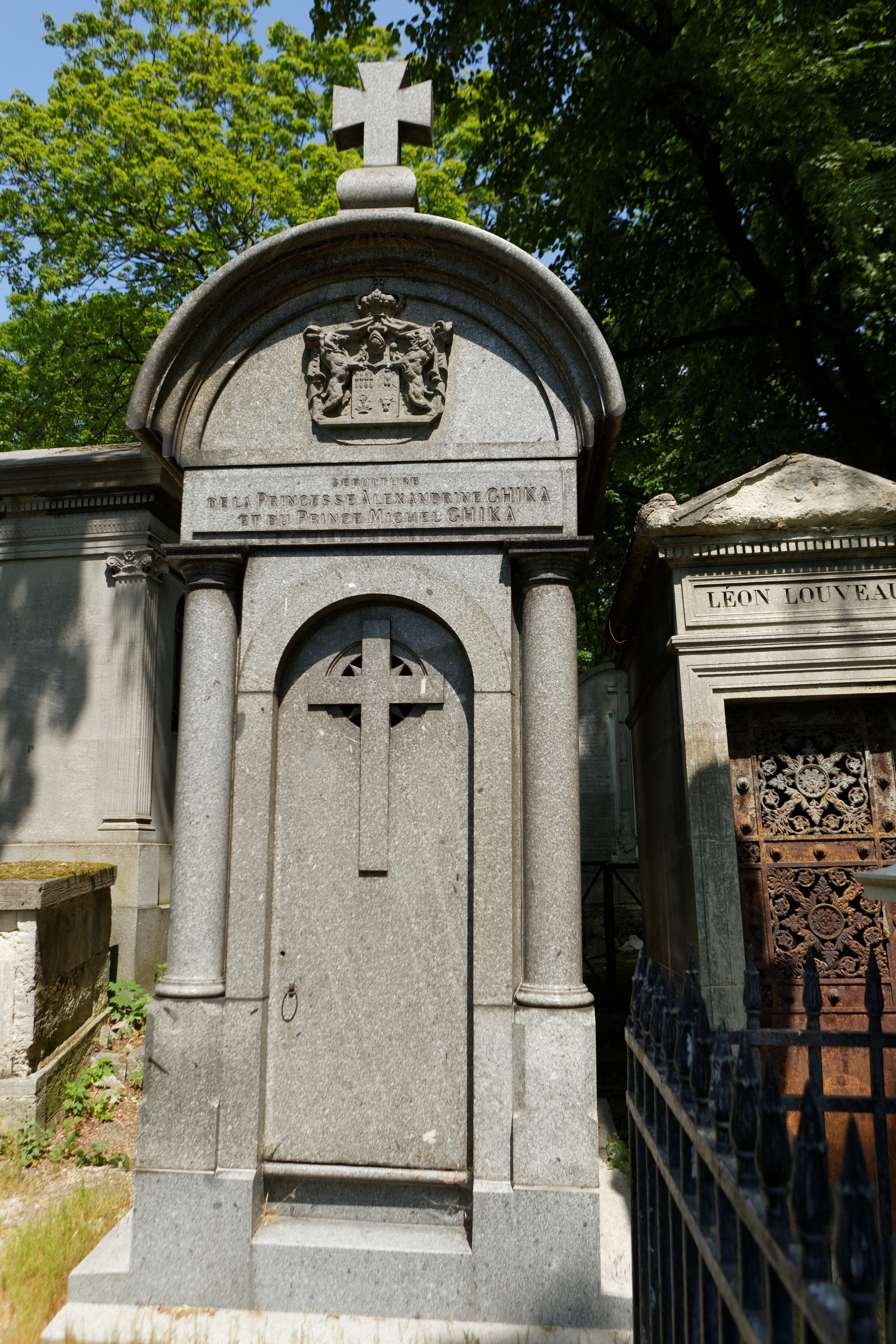
Grave of Alexandrina and Mihai Ghica, at Père Lachaise

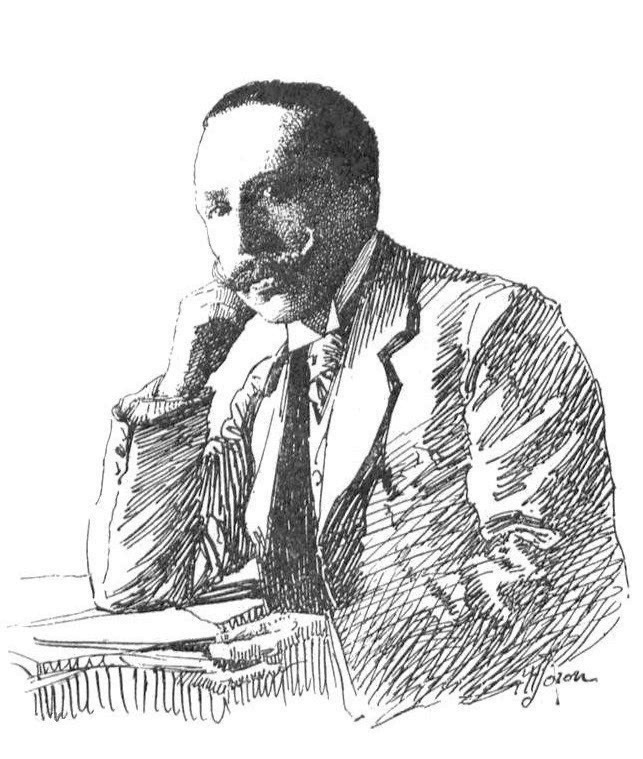
Marițica's grandson, Léon de Montesquiou. Posthumous etching by Maurice Joron (1916)

With Prince Bibescu, Marițica had two daughters: Maria or Marie, who is described in some sources as born to Zoe Brâncoveanu, and Elena. The former married Count Odon, of the prestigious Montesquiou family, while the latter became wife of Baron Victor de Courval. Elena, a celebrated volunteer nurse, died at age 35 in Pontresina; her funeral in Paris was attended by her Ghica siblings. Together, Maria and Odon had four sons and one daughter, Hélène, known as Princess Lucinge after her 1897 marriage to Gérard Marie Joseph René de Faucigny-Lucinge. One of the male children, Ferdinand (or Fernand) de Montesquiou-Fézensac, also known as "Fez", lived in the Kingdom of Romania as a bohemian socialite, owning Băneasa estate. He was openly gay, and his escapades served to inspire writings by his friend, the novelist Mateiu Caragiale. He died after illness in 1920.

Ferdinand's younger brother Léon de Montesquiou was involved in the political and intellectual debates of the Third Republic and the Belle Époque. Originally a left-leaning liberal, he joined the hard-right Ligue de la patrie française in 1898. He became a founding member of the larger Action Française the following year, earning his reputation as both a nationalist-antisemitic doctrinaire and a writer on Romanian subjects. Having lost his officer's rank for his anti-Dreyfusard propaganda, he enlisted as a regular soldier on the Western Front. Léon was eventually reinstated as a Lieutenant, but was killed in action during the Second Battle of Champagne, at Souain. Another brother, Raoul, who lived to 1934, spent most of his time at the Château de Courtanvaux in Bessé-sur-Braye.

=== In the arts ===
Marițica maintained an interest in promoting Romanian literature. In 1843, she was a founding member of the Literary Association, created by C. G. Filipescu and Ștefan Golescu; in 1846, she promised to sponsor a "universal library" of translations. However, soon after her ascent to the throne, she had become the target of verse satire by Constantin D. Aricescu, taken up in the newspaper Curierul Românesc or recited in public at a Câmpulung gathering. The princely couple responded by shunning Aricescu, who then had trouble finding employment. Later in life, Aricescu also published more corrosive poems by a Petrache Eliat, which, he claimed, had also circulated during Bibescu's reign. Some were sexualized in content, and had to be published with ellipses marking censored fragments. One such piece suggests that Marițica was having intercourse with her coach driver, or with her brother-in-law Știrbei. Another Eliat rhyme coined the expression Azi aici, mâine-n Focșani ("Here today, tomorrow in Focșani"), which refers to Bibescu's erotic haste.

Aricescu's perspective was contrasted by portrayals in the Bibescu regime's propaganda, which enlisted poets Ion Heliade Rădulescu and Grigore Alexandrescu. Both wrote her epithalamia in 1845, though Alexandrescu struck his version out of his complete works editions. According to the 1848 revolutionary Ion Ghica, Alexandrescu was a guest at princely dinner parties, but felt humiliated by Marițica's offer that he become her court poet. The series of homages to the Princess was completed in 1847, when Heliade's disciple Costache Aristia published Doamna Maria. Later in the 19th century, national poet Mihai Eminescu revisited Gheorghe and Marițica Bibescu's plight with more sympathy, producing a rhyme based on Romanian folklore:

Frunză verde și-o lalea,
Ah, Marițica, doamna mea,
La Bibescu că intra:
Iorgule Bibescule,
Iată firman de la Sultan
Să te lipsești de domnie,
Să priimești boerie.

Translation:

Green leaf and tulip leaf,
Marițica, o my grief,
Came to give Bibescu preef:
O my Gheorghe, o Bibescu,
Here's a firman from the Sultan
Ordering that you step down,
And receive a boyar's gown.

1840s propaganda also includes several paintings, often showing the Princess dressed in traditional peasant clothing. According to art historian Ruxandra Beldiman, she may have been the first lady to adhere to this fashion, which also stated her support for the cultural ideals of Romanian nationalism. The earliest such canvass, an official portrait, was done by Carol Szathmari, probably in 1845; it combines elements of peasant clothing from Argeș County, including a necklace made from coins, with echoes of the Byzantine dress. Szathmari also created a miniature portrait on ivory, showing Marițica in an eclectic peasant costume, and following the blue-yellow-red scheme of Wallachian army flags and the modern Romanian tricolor. The nationalist imagery is also found in a portrait done by Constantin Lecca and dated to c. 1849, when the Bibescus were living abroad. Here, Marițica is shown in Transylvanian Romanian attire, and operating a loom. The canvass is described by art historian Vasile Florea as one of the works in which Lecca "outdid himself", and overall as an "important genre painting".

Of these various pieces, the Szathmari canvass was rediscovered by Nicolae Iorga and published in his Histoire des Roumains (1944), but then largely forgotten until 2012, when it was reproduced in color for the first time in its history. Iorga himself attributed the discovery of another such portrait to Constantin Gane, who first published it in 1940. The Prince and Princess are also commemorated in frescoes at their Père Lachaise crypt, done by Auguste Leloir and later by Jules Jean François Pérot. These show her as a penitent and as Mary Magdalene, in probable allusion to her adultery and divorce. Additionally, her likeness is preserved in the relief decorating her sarcophagus, which is probably the work of Eugène André Oudiné.

Several objets d'art belonging to the Princess are preserved at the Museum of the Union in Iași, and are stamped with her personal coat of arms. The field is a combination of her two family arms, party per fess: the Wallachian bird, displayed as in the Bibescu arms, appears in chief; and the Văcărescu arms, depicting a knight guarding Făgăraș Citadel, in the bottom half. A quartered variant of the combined arms, including the Romanian tricolor, came to represent the Bibescu–Văcărescu descendants. It appears as a relief at Père Lachaise, and was also used by the Baroness Courval; Grégoire Brancovan also adopted the arms, but with different tinctures. Marițica's ascent to the throne was an influence on other members of her original family. Ana-Maria Văcărescu, married Callimachi, upgraded her version of the Văcărescu arms to feature a princely crown, rather than the comital crown of earlier depictions.

Marițica Bibescu's personal arms

Văcărescu family arms, regular version

Bibescu family arms

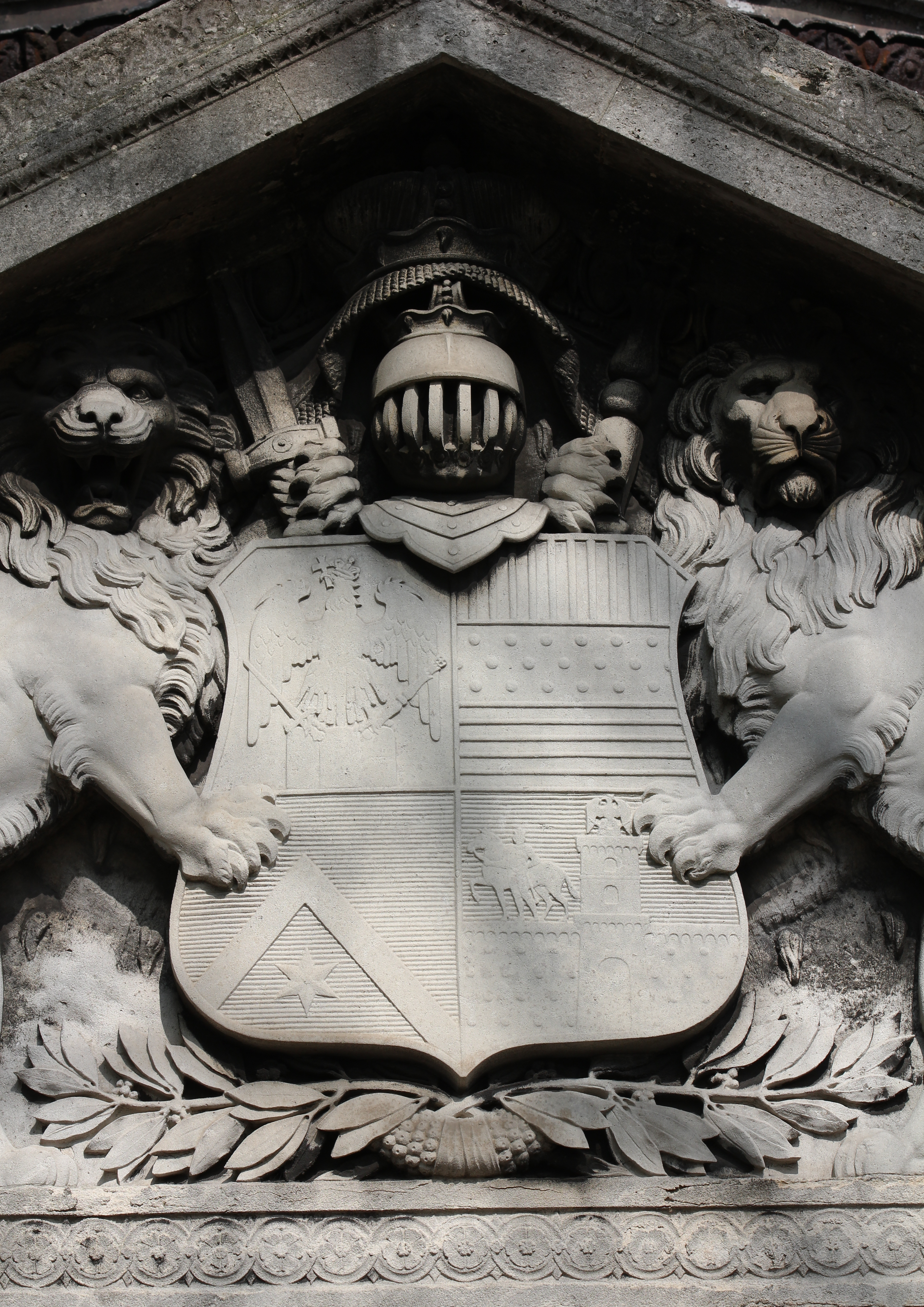
Composite Bibescu arms, with Văcărescu arms in the 4th quarter; family crypt, Père Lachaise
