= Claymoor (Mișu Văcărescu) =

Romanian journalist (c. 1842–1903)

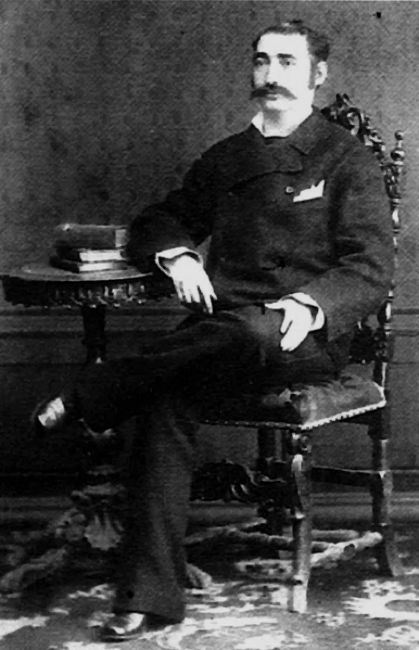
- Claymoor in a pre-1900 photograph
- Born: Mișu (Mihail Ion) Văcărescu; 1842 or 1843
- Died: June 12, 1903 (aged 60–61); Bucharest, Kingdom of Romania
- Occupations: Journalist, army officer
- Relatives: Iancu Văcărescu (father); Alecu Văcărescu (grandfather); Elena Văcărescu (niece); Ioan Văcărescu (brother)
- Writing career
- Period: 1873–1903
- Genres: fashion journalism, gossip column, theater criticism, film criticism

Mișu or Mihail Ion Văcărescu (Francized Michel Vacaresco; 1842 or 1843 – June 12, 1903), most commonly known as Claymoor, was a Wallachian, later Romanian fashion journalist and gossip columnist, the son of poet Iancu Văcărescu. A retired cavalry officer in the Romanian Land Forces, he began writing in his late twenties or early thirties, reaching his fame as a contributor to the Francophone daily L'Indépendance Roumaine. He was widely respected for his verdicts on fashion, and, as an arbiter of taste, contributed to his paper's renown; however, people of his day also ridiculed him for his florid literary style, his political involvement with the Conservative Party, and his homosexuality.

Claymoor's period of prominence, at the height of the Belle Époque, ended with his sudden death. By that time, he had also left a mark as one of Romania's first film critics. Although his almanac was still published, he himself was largely forgotten in the Kingdom of Romania by the end of World War I. Traces of his memory are preserved in disguised portrayals and parodies by writers such as Ion Luca Caragiale and Petru Dumitriu.

== Biography ==
=== Early life and debut ===
Văcărescu's exact birth date remains unknown. However, he died at the age of 60 or 61, meaning that he was born in 1842 or 1843. It also certain that he was of aristocratic upbringing, from the Văcărescu family, and directly related to other prominent families of Wallachian boyars; unlike them, he had inherited little wealth. He was the son of the more famous Wallachian poet Iancu (Ioan) Văcărescu, and as such grandson of Alecu and grandnephew of Ienăchiță Văcărescu. His great-grandfather Ianache Văcărescu had served Prince Constantin Brâncoveanu during the Pruth River Campaign, and had been executed alongside him. Other ancestors of the journalist had been in constant conflict with the Phanariote princes who succeeded Brâncoveanu: Ienăchiță and his brothers were most likely poisoned, while Alecu was imprisoned under false charges. Iancu was also a dissident during the Regulamentul Organic regime. Arrested for various intervals, he had his land confiscated by Prince Alexandru II Ghica. After Ghica's downfall, he ran in the first princely election, winning just 21 votes from 179. His aunt, Marițica Văcărescu-Ghica, went on to marry the winner of that race, Gheorghe Bibescu, after a years-long scandal. She was also a poet, although her work remained unpublished.

Mihail's mother Ecaterina (1819–1891), also a boyaress, descended from the Cantacuzino family through a Moldavian offshoot, and claimed ownership of an estate in Pașcani. Despite her generous dowry, the family faced bankruptcy and, during Mihail's infancy, had to go into real estate as landlords. She had eight other children with Iancu, six of whom survived into adulthood: Eufrosina m. Greceanu (1837–1870), a homemaker and courtesan; Ioan (1839–1914), a career soldier and father of writer Elena Văcărescu; Maria m. Fălcoianu (1841–1912); Ecaterina m. Lahovary (1846–1917); Alexandrina m. Darvary (1851–1899); Constantin (1850–1899). Claymoor's cousins also included Theodor C. Văcărescu, the diplomat and historian. The clan had acquired a bad reputation in social circles. Novelist and diplomat Duiliu Zamfirescu notes that, by 1890, the Văcărescus were "not an attractive spectacle", especially with their "collateral female relatives." As reported by the boyar memoirist Constantin Argetoianu, all surviving Văcărescus formed a vicleim (masquerade): Alexandrina was "the only bright one" among Iancu's children, but, like them, was cradled into "vice and filth". Argetoianu thus notes that her Darvary home doubled as a gambling den, where cheating aristocrats and their accusers would engage in fistfights.

A graduate of Lycée Henri-IV in Paris, Mihail Văcărescu always endured as a "great friend of France", according to his colleagues at Le Figaro. Orphaned at age 20, when his father died "of a cold", he and his siblings split his fortune between them and Iancu's creditors. His first calling was the army, and he reached a Captain's rank in the cavalry corps of the United Principalities, later retiring to take up work for the Bucharest daily press. According to several accounts, he was by then openly gay, or, as historian Ion Bulei writes, "a notorious pederast"; an 1891 piece in Budapesti Hírlap had it that he was "famous throughout Bucharest for his scandalous life". Zamfirescu portrays him as "an unbelievable type, who wore bracelets like a woman, pink nail polish, a tuft of hair which supposedly hid his bald spot, and who was rumored to be of the ticklish kind." Writer-diplomat Gheorghe Crutzescu also notes that Claymoor "did not quite like women", although he was particularly fond of cross-dressing acts such as La Belle Otero and the Barrison Sisters. Around 1890, he was involved in a legal conflict with a Major Baldovici, and rumor spread in the rival press that he had tried to seduce him and other army subordinates. However, Bacalbașa disputes such "mean-spirited" rumors as "fables".

Văcărescu family arms

Cantacuzino family arms, variant used c. 1900

Horse brand used by the Pașcani boyars

Văcărescu's first experience with Francophone journalism was at La Roumanie daily (1873–1876), where he used the pen name Velréas. He later had a stint at the left-wing paper Românul (1877–1879), where he began using his consecrated pen name. As Claymoor, he began his activity at L'Indépendance Roumaine in 1879 or 1880, taking over for the Frenchman Ulysse de Marsillac. During November 1881, he covered Sarah Bernhardt's Romanian tour, giving it an enthusiastic appraisal. He also skirted controversy by defending Bernhardt's method of using stooges for increased exposure in the press. Simultaneously, as Babylas, he was writing for La Roumanie Ilustrée.

These early chronicles coincided with the introduction of electric lighting, which, from c. 1882, allowed open-air night parties to become fashionable. Claymoor's regular chronicle was the Carnet du High-life, which later spawned an Almanach du High-Life. His first almanac had been La Vie à Bucarest 1882–1883 ("Life in Bucharest 1882–1883"), published with Theil & Weiss company, followed by La Lanterne Mondaine ("Worldly Lantern") in 1884. That year, in February, Claymoor had a row with the editor of L'Indépendance Roumaine, Alexandru Ciurcu, and briefly left to work for Gazette de Roumanie. In his own words, this was a "rather burlesque incident", sparked by Ciurcu's attempt to remove from the fashion column "all those parties he was never invited to."

=== Arbiter of fashion ===
Claymoor soon became one of the regulars at the journalists' hangout, Casa Capșa, frequenting a society that also included Nicolae Filipescu and N. T. Orășanu. Memoirist Constantin Bacalbașa recalls him as "perfectly collegial", "a very decent man". However, he also cautions that Claymoor "was a journalist, but by no means was he one of the journalistic world; he lived inside the boyar society that had spawned and raised him". More controversially, from 1888, when he became a Romanian delegate to the Paris World Fair, Claymoor was depicted as a political client of the ruling Conservative Party. Reports of that have it that he was also considered for the Prefecture of Constanța County by the Theodor Rosetti cabinet. A local correspondent for Telegraphul noted, tongue-in-cheek: "High-society ladies are in favor of [his] appointment, and so is the Muslim population, especially now [in August 1888] that we are celebrating Bayram." Further embrassement came in the early 1890s, when Crown Prince Ferdinand announced that he intended to marry Claymoor's niece Elena. This highly unpopular move resulted in a "violent campaign [of] curses, vulgarities and lies" directed at the Văcărescu family.

Writer George Costescu describes L'Indépendance Roumaine as adhering to "Western journalistic norms", and notes Claymoor's role in pioneering locally the genre of "fashion reports": "the crafty Mihail Văcărescu-Claymoor chronicled all the political and diplomatic receptions, all artistic reunions and balls, concerts, fêtes and weddings involving Bucharest's elite families." The concept was criticized by anti-elitists. In 1912, the left-wing George Ranetti argued that Carnet du High-life would have been "more or less justified in a city like Paris", but asked: "what point could it serve in Romania?" In the absence of an aristocratic culture, Claymoor only "fed the vanities" of a commercial "plutocracy". Similarly, Bulei sees the Carnet as copying from Le Figaro and Le Gaulois, "but with its Dâmbovița relish." He suggests that some of the chronicles—for instance one describing Zoe Sturdza, wife of the politician D. A. Sturdza—were unintentionally amusing.

Early reviewers were similarly inclined. In 1890, Amiculu Familiei newspaper described Claymoor as "a sad figure in [Romanian] journalism". It deplored the Frenchified culture which had produced Claymoor, but also noted that his metaphorical style was being laughed at by the Belgian paper La Réforme. Yet, as Bacalbașa notes, Claymoor's writings made him "a tiny celebrity": "for 24 years Bucharest has had its Claymoor epoch." According to the same source, Claymoor could describe "wonderfully and competently the ladies' full attire at the various soirées that he attended. Some claimed that [Claymoor] was being paid by luxury seamstresses, but this was never proven true." Reportedly, subscribing to L'Indépendance Roumaine and "only reading Claymoor's notebook therein" was a central preoccupation for girls just out of boarding school. According to Crutzescu: "not being cited by Claymoor [...] was a catastrophe, an insult that equated social death. Which is why Claymoor's home was always full of diverse gifts, from ladies who wished not to be forgotten, or overlooked." Văcărescu's recommendations were such "that all fashionable society would adopt both the seamstress and the attire."

At times, Claymoor's contributions doubled as theater criticism, such as when, in November 1884, he chronicled O scrisoare pierdută, by the Romanian classic Ion Luca Caragiale. His rejection of Caragiale was not total, as with other reviewers of the day—he was convinced that O scrisoare was vastly inferior to Caragiale's earlier work, A Stormy Night, and also acknowledged that they were both loved by theatergoers; his critique was itself judged negatively by later critics, who see O scrisoare as a lasting milestone in Romanian theater. Repeatedly included in retrospectives as one of Caragiale's detractors, he also criticized Caragiale and Paul Gusty for adapting and staging an anti-war play in 1888. However, he applauded their production of Wilbrandt's Tochter des Herrn Fabricius. His competence in the field was doubted early on by columnist Dimitrie Rosetti-Max. When, in 1887, it was announced that Claymoor would be staff critic for a French troupe touring Bucharest, Rosetti-Max remarked: "This leads me to suspect that the troupe doesn't even have costumes yet, and that Claymoor [...] is there to assess whether the artistes' corsages pass midnight inspection".

Claymoor earned more respect as a pioneer cinema critic: in 1896–1897, he was among the first to chronicle the earliest Romanian film shows and, as film historian Dinu-Ioan Nicola argues, had "surprising critical intuitions." Having been present at a screening of Paul Menu's "Romanian vistas" in May 1897, Claymoor prophesied that "cinema will reestablish truth and the sincerity of our lives will be transmitted over the ages, beyond ourselves. To us it is entertainment. To future generations, it will be a priceless document". As argued by one anonymous witness, Claymoor was personally involved in film promotion, making excuses for the technical difficulties and delays. His Carnet, "I believe, has reached the peak of its glory during these days."

Satirical depictions of Claymoor
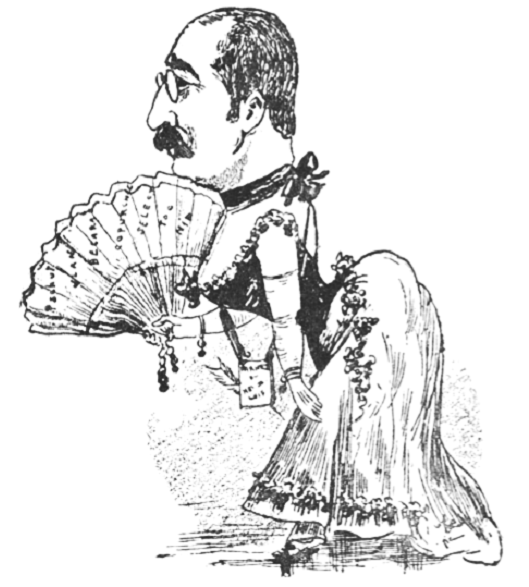
In drag, as pictured in 1898 by Constantin Jiquidi

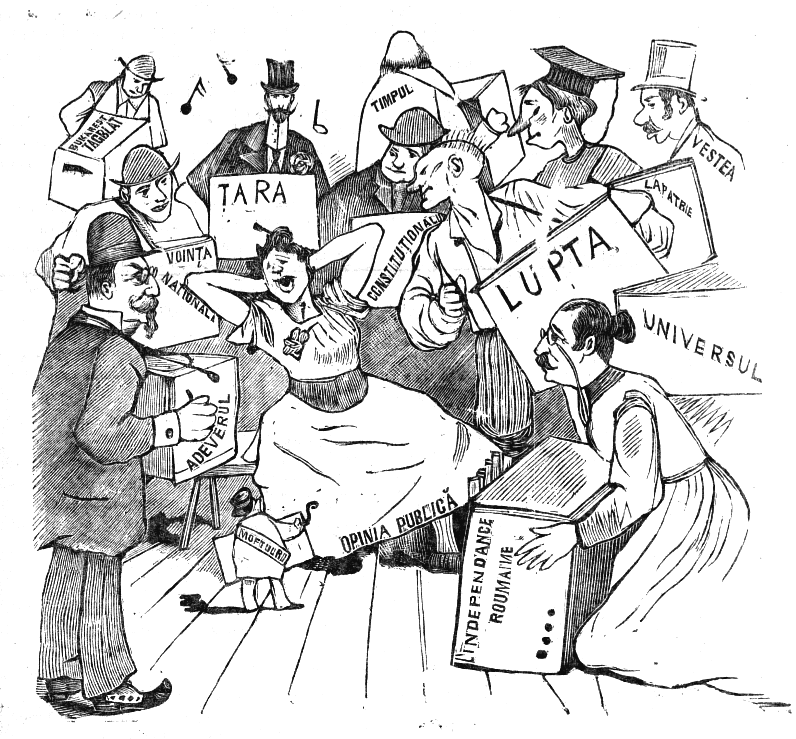
Another cross-dressing drawing by Jiquidi (1893). Pictured with rival journalists Alexandru Beldiman and Grigore Ventura, vying for the public's attention

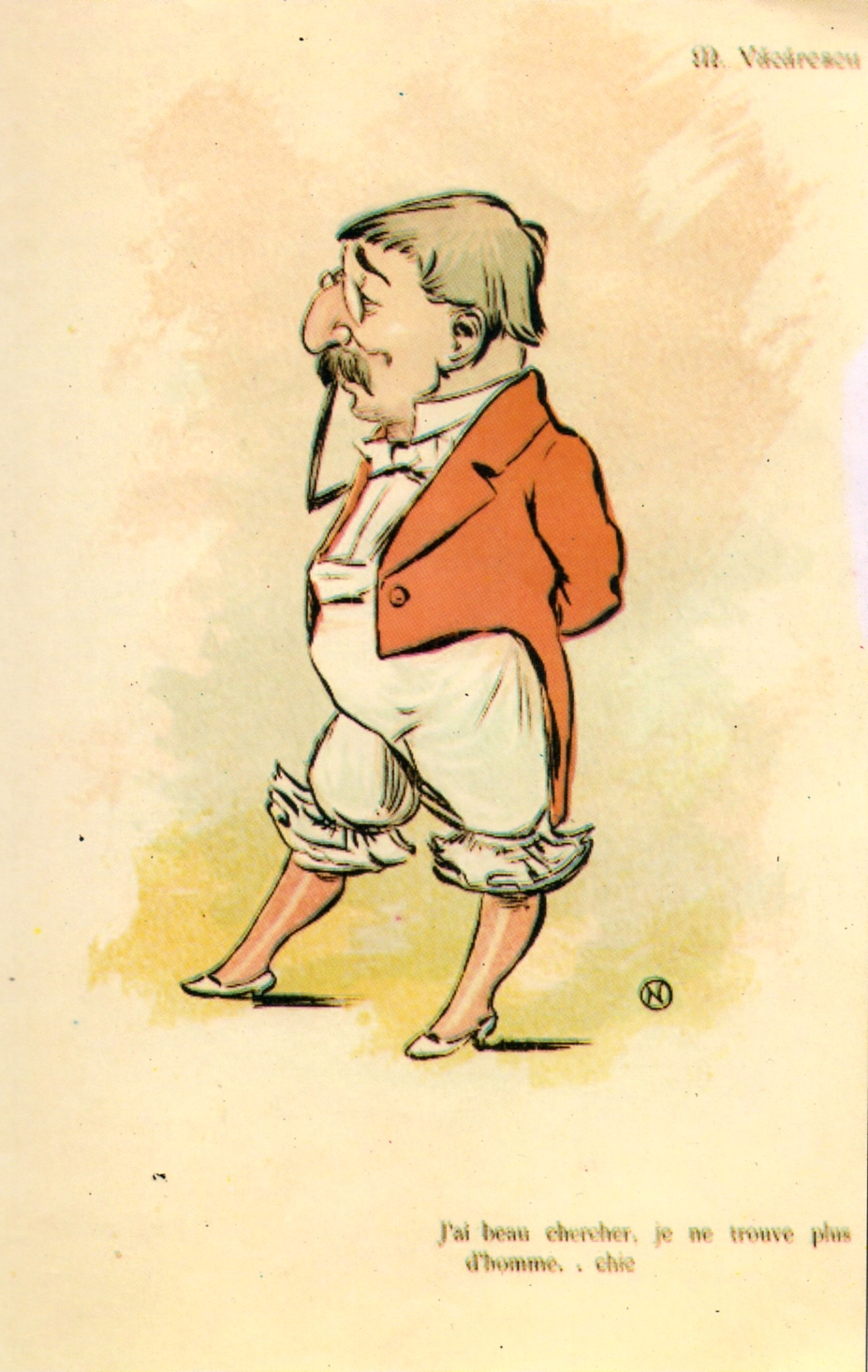
Cartoon by Nicolae Petrescu Găină (date unknown)

Having contributed directly to L'Indépendance Roumaine's success (it became the second-most popular newspaper by 1897), Claymoor made a return trip to Paris in 1899. He died in Bucharest on June 12, 1903, after falling down in front of L'Indépendance Roumaine office, just as he was bringing in his latest Carnet chronicle. Although he is sometimes assumed to have died there, on the spot, he actually did so at his sister's home. The ultimate cause of death was a peptic ulcer. Claymoor was buried at Bellu cemetery, Plot 17. His objets d'art were auctioned off by January 1904, but the Almanach du High-Life continued to be published over the following years.

== Legacy ==
By the 1920s, Bacalbașa claims, "nobody so much as remember[ed] this [...] arbiter of female elegance". Crutzescu also noted in passing that Claymoor's writing style was antiquated, "so very obnoxious". His "yellowing notebooks", Crutzescu writes, revealed a world "of bearded and mustachioed gents and ladies with malakoffs that, when stirred, will rustle the way dead leaves do." Nevertheless, according to Ranetti, his "aping of the Paris press" created a school of party chroniclers, or "Claymoorlings". These journalists, Ranetti noted, were even active at Adevărul, a nominally working-class paper.

Claymoor's likeness is preserved in the work of various cartoonists, including his Capșa colleague Constantin Jiquidi, who drew him doing drag. Claymoor also endured as the hero of "so many anecdotes" relating to his lifestyle and his alleged vanities. By the end of his life, he was completely bald, but was hiding it. One such story claims that his wig came off while bathing on the Romanian littoral and he went chasing for it in the water. Other accounts contrarily suggest that he had managed to keep his baldness secret to his death, when his wig finally had to be removed.

From the beginning of his career in journalism, Claymoor's style irritated more senior writers, prompting them to caricature him in their fiction. In 1883, Ion Ghica and Dimitrie C. Ollănescu-Ascanio had sketched out a comedy of mores, which, if finalized, was to feature a leading character based on Claymoor. Anton Bacalbașa also refers to Claymoor as the favorite writer of Moș Teacă's ignorant wife, and gives him a brief role in one of his sketches (where Claymoore's homosexuality is again hinted at). Claymoor is more famous as the target of satires by Caragiale, in his Momente și schițe series—one of his favorite techniques here was to pastiche Claymoor's "pirouettes-and-colored-ribbons" prose. Caragiale's sketch "High-life", first published on Christmas Eve 1899, is entirely dedicated to Claymoor, who appears as "Edgar Bostandaki" or "Turturel" ("Turtledove"), chronicler for the fictional Voice of the Aurochs. A licentious typo subverts his description of a high-society dame as an "indefatigable sylphid", and he has to deal with her husband's wrath (readers were left unsure as to what the hinted typo was).

There are other supposed echoes of Claymoor in Romanian prose. One had roots in the conflicts opposing members of the Caragiale family: while Ion Luca resented and mocked Claymoor, his estranged eldest son, Mateiu Caragiale, grew up avidly reading his almanac (a fact mentioned in his autobiographical novella, Sub pecetea tainei). Author Radu Cernătescu believes that Claymoor is the character "Poponel", appearing in Craii de Curtea-Veche—Mateiu's 1929 novel. This contradicts other accounts, according to which "Poponel" is based on another Romanian aristocrat, who was still alive in 1936. As noted by historian Matei Cazacu, the younger Caragiale had probably never met Claymoor, but was perhaps acquainted with his sisters. Cazacu identifies Alexandrina and Ecaterina Văcărescu as Mima and Tita Arnoteanu, who are prominently featured, and mocked, in his Craii. Caragiale Jr was also publicly friends with a gay man, Count Ferdinand de Montesquiou-Fézensac. A distant relative of Claymoor's, the Count had died nine years before Craii's publication. As noted by Angelo Mitchievici, Montesquiou-Fézensac is turned into a Bostandaki-like caricature in Caragiale's novel.

Such tropes also appeared at a later stage in literature, during the period of communist rule (1948–1989). During the 1950s, Petru Dumitriu referred to Claymoor (as "Michel Ipsilanti-Seymour"), and to the Bostandaki–typo sketch, in his own novel, Family Chronicle. Also then, Mircea Ștefănescu wrote a play about actor Matei Millo, with Claymoor as one of the secondary characters, set out to "destroy" Caragiale; in the 1953 production, he was played by Mihai Berechet. Upon reviewing this staging, Contemporanul journal referred to Claymoor himself as a "cosmopolitan critic" of Caragiale, and also as a "house servant" of the upper classes. During the later stages of communism, there were also more lenient verdicts: in 1970, writer Petru Vintilă made a short note on Claymoor's life, as part of his "Bucharest Engravings" column. The piece mentioned a "tiny, stupefying mythology" that had surrounded Claymoor, and repeated rumors about his writing having been secretly sponsored by couturiers. The communist decades had intensified taboos regarding Claymoor's sexuality, with mentions of him monitored by the censorship apparatus. This was noted in January 1990 by literary critic Dan C. Mihăilescu: "how could one propose to publish a book on, say, [...] the forms of insanity in Romanian literature, when, if one was to write about Mișu Văcărescu, he found mentions of 'pederasty' cut out of the text, and was then forced to engage in the usual euphemistic exercises!"
