= List of Romanian-language poets =

The following is a list of famous or notable Romanian language poets grouped by period of activity (years link to corresponding "[year] in poetry" articles):

== The beginnings ==
- Gheorghe Asachi (1788–1869)
- Vasile Cârlova (1809–1832)
- Dosoftei (1624–1693)
- Anton Pann (1794–1854)
- Ienăchiță Văcărescu (1740–1797)
- Alecu Văcărescu (1769–1799)

== Classical Age ==
- Vasile Alecsandri (1821–1890)
- Grigore Alexandrescu (1810–1885)
- George Coșbuc (1866–1918)
- Mihai Eminescu (1850–1889)
- Octavian Goga (1881–1938)
- Ștefan Octavian Iosif (1875–1913)
- Alexandru Macedonski (1854–1920)
- Veronica Micle (1850–1889)
- Andrei Mureșanu (1816–1863)
- Ion Heliade Rădulescu (1802–1872)
- Constantin Stamati (1786–1869)
- Carmen Sylva (1843–1916)

== Interwar period ==
- Tudor Arghezi (1880–1967)
- George Bacovia (1881–1955)
- Ion Barbu (1859–1961)
- Lucian Blaga (1895–1961)
- Nichifor Crainic (1898–1972)
- Radu Gyr (1905–1975)
- Ion Minulescu (1881–1944)
- Gellu Naum (1915–2001)
- Ion Pillat (1891–1945)
- George Topârceanu (1886–1937)
- Tristan Tzara (1896–1963)
- Vasile Voiculescu (1884–1963)
- Ilarie Voronca (1903 –1946)
- Geo Bogza (1908 –1993)

== Post-war period ==
- George Alboiu (born 1944)
- Ioan Alexandru (1941–2000)
- A.E. Baconsky (1925–1977)
- Cezar Baltag (1939–1997)
- Mihai Beniuc (1907–1988)
- Ana Blandiana (born 1942)
- Emil Brumaru (born 1939)
- Paul Celan (1920–1970)
- Leonid Dimov (1926–1987)
- Mircea Dinescu (born 1950)
- Ștefan Augustin Doinaș (1922–2002)
- Șerban Foarță (born 1942)
- Dumitru Găleșanu (born 1955)
- Eugen Jebeleanu (1911–1991)
- Nicolae Labiș (1935–1956)
- Gherasim Luca (1913–1994)
- Angela Marinescu (born 1941)
- Virgil Mazilescu (1942–1984)
- Gellu Naum (1915–2001)
- Adrian Păunescu (born 1943)
- Adrian Popescu (born 1947)
- Marin Sorescu (1936–1996)
- Nichita Stănescu (1933–1983)
- Petre Stoica (1931–2009)
- Dorin Tudoran (born 1945)

== Contemporary ==
- Constantin Virgil Bănescu (1982–2009)
- Maria Berényi (born 1959)
- Zoltán Böszörményi (born 1951)
- Ionuț Caragea (born 1975)
- Mircea Cărtărescu (born 1956)
- Ruxandra Cesereanu (born 1963)
- Traian T. Coșovei (born 1954–2014)
- Nichita Danilov (born 1952)
- Mircea Dinescu (born 1950)
- Șerban Foarță (born 1942)
- Dumitru Găleșanu (born 1955)
- Mariana Marin (1956–2003)
- Angela Marinescu (born 1941)
- Alexandru Mușina (1954–2013)
- Marta Petreu (born 1955)
- Cristian Popescu (1959–1995)
