= Văcarea =

Văcarea may refer to several villages in Romania:

- Văcarea, a village in Mihăești Commune, Argeș County
- Văcarea, a village in Dănești Commune, Gorj County

and to a river in Romania:

- Văcarea River, a tributary of the Râul Târgului

== See also ==
- Văcărești (disambiguation)
- Văcăria River (disambiguation)
- Văcărescu family
