= Nicolae Văcărescu =

Boyar Nicolae Văcărescu
- Born: 1786
- Died: 1825 (aged 38–39)
- Occupation: Poet
- Children: Marițica Bibescu
- Parents: Ienăchiță Văcărescu (father); Ecaterina Caragea (mother)
- Relatives: Alecu Văcărescu (half-brother)
- Family: Văcărescu

Nicolae Văcărescu was a Wallachian boyar and poet. Son of writer Ienăchiță Văcărescu, he was a member of the Văcărescu family.
