= Elena Văcărescu =

Romanian-French writer and aristocrat (1864–1947)

- Elena Văcărescu
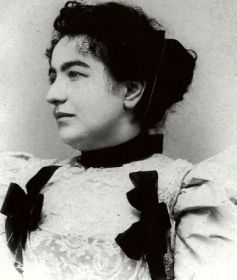
- Young Elena Văcărescu
- Born: Elena Văcărescu; October 3, 1864; Bucharest, United Principalities
- Died: February 17, 1947 (aged 82); Paris, France
- Resting place: Bellu Cemetery, Bucharest
- Occupations: Poet, writer, memoirist, novelist, playwright, translator
- Relatives: Ioan Văcărescu (father); Eufrosina Fălcoianu (mother); Iancu Văcărescu (grandfather); Claymoor (uncle)
- Writing career
- Language: French
- Genres: Memoir, poetry
- Notable works: Chants d'Aurore, Le Rhapsode de la Dâmbovița
- Notable awards: French Academy Award

Signature
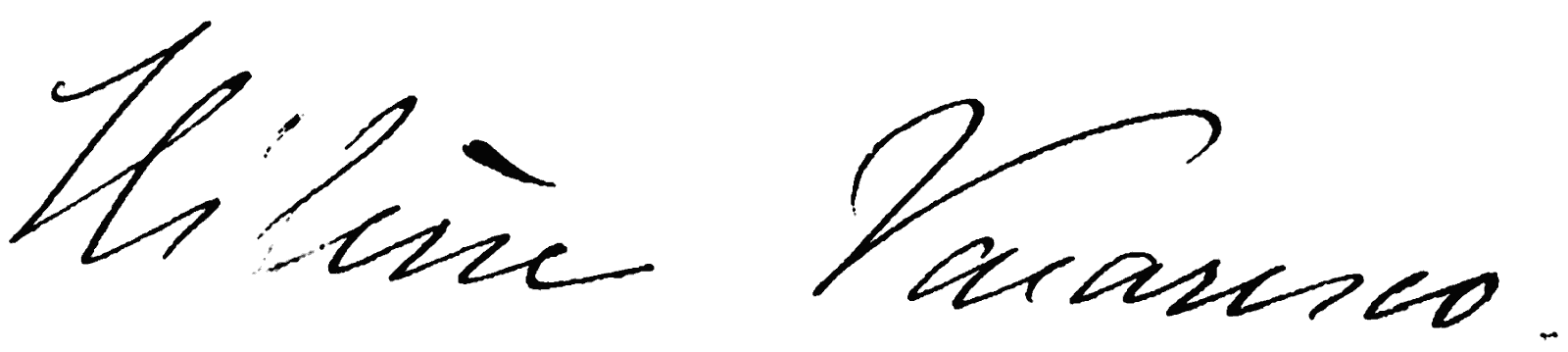

Elena Văcărescu, or Hélène Vacaresco (September 21, 1864 in Bucharest – February 17, 1947 in Paris), was a Romanian-French aristocrat writer, twice a laureate of the Académie Française.

== Life ==
Through her father, Ioan Văcărescu, she descended from a long line of boyars of Wallachia (the Văcărescu family ), including Ienăchiță Văcărescu, the poet who wrote the first Romanian grammar. She was also a granddaughter of Romanian poet Iancu Văcărescu. Through her mother, Eufrosina Fălcoianu, she descended from the Fălcoianu family, a prominent clan in the times of Prince Michael the Brave.

She spent most of her youth on the Văcărescu estate near Târgoviște. Elena first got acquainted with English literature through her English governess, Miss Allan. She also studied French literature in Paris, where she met Victor Hugo, whom she later mentioned in her memoirs. She attended courses of philosophy, aesthetics and history and also studied poetry under the guidance of Sully Prudhomme.

Another influence on her early life was the Russo-Turkish War of 1877–1878, known in Romania as the War of Independence; the country declared independence from the Ottoman Empire and joined the camp of Imperial Russia. Elena's father fought in the war; the experience influenced her first book, which was published in 1886.

The meeting that changed her life was that with Elisabeth of Wied, Queen of Romania. The wife of King Carol I, she invited her to the palace in 1888. Interested in Văcărescu's literary achievements, Elisabeth became much more interested in the person of the poet. Having not yet recovered from the death of her only daughter in 1874, Elisabeth transferred all her maternal love to Elena.

In 1889, the lack of heirs to the Romanian throne made Carol adopt his nephew Ferdinand of Hohenzollern-Sigmaringen, whose loneliness in a strange country made him close to Elena, fall in love with her, and eventually express the desire to marry her. However, according to the 1866 Constitution of Romania, the heir to the throne was not allowed to marry a Romanian. The result of the affair was that Elisabeth, who had encouraged the romance, was exiled to Neuwied for two years, Elena was exiled to Paris for life, and Ferdinand was sent off in search of a new bride, which he eventually found in Marie of Edinburgh.

Văcărescu was the Substitute Delegate to the League of Nations from 1921 to 1924. She was a permanent delegate from 1925 to 1926. She was again a Substitute Delegate to the League of Nations from 1926 to 1938. She was the only woman to serve with the rank of ambassador (permanent delegate) in the history of the League of Nations.

In 1925, she was welcomed as a foreign honorary member of the Romanian Academy. She translated into French, works of Romanian poets such as Mihai Eminescu, Lucian Blaga, Octavian Goga, George Topîrceanu, Ion Minulescu, and Ion Vinea.

Just before her death, Văcărescu was a member of the Romanian delegation, headed by Gheorghe Tătărescu, to the Paris Peace Conference, after World War II. She is interred in the Văcărescu family crypt in the Bellu Cemetery, in Bucharest.

== Published books ==
=== Original poetry ===
- Chants d'Aurore (1886)
- L'âme sereine (1896)
- Lueurs et Flammes (1903)
- Le Jardin passioné (1908)
- La Dormeuse éveillée (1914)

=== Folklore themes interpreted ===
- Le Rhapsode de la Dâmboviţa (1889)
- Nuits d'Orient (1907)
- Dans l'or du soir (1927)

=== Novels ===
- Amor vincit (1908)
- Le Sortilege (1911)

=== Memoirs ===
- Kings and Queens I Have Known (1904)
- Memorial sur le mode mineur (1945)
- Le Roman de ma vie

=== Theatre ===
- Stana (1904)
- Pe urma dragostei

== Gallery ==
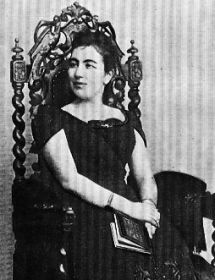

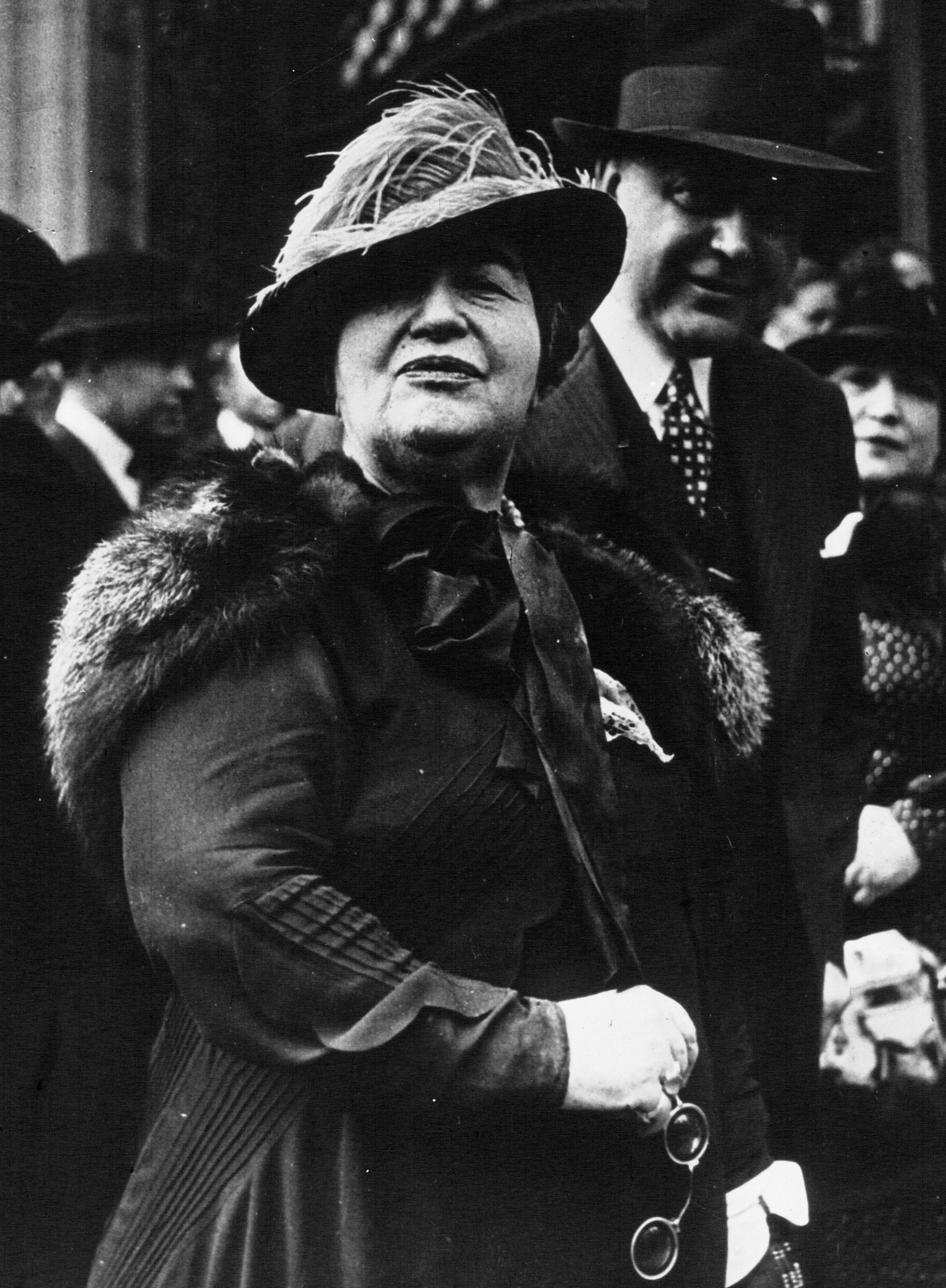

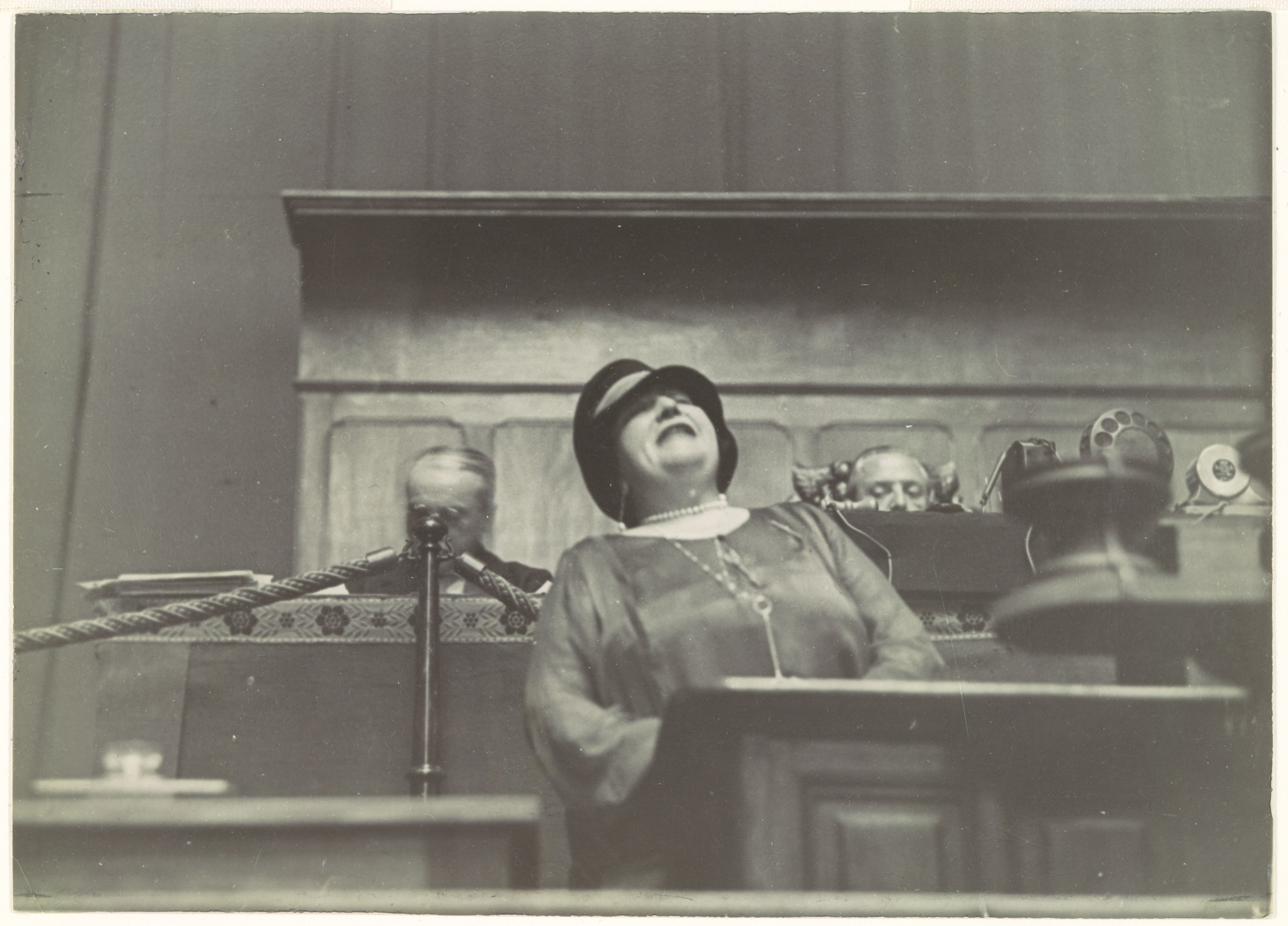
