= Iancu Văcărescu =

Romanian Wallachian boyar and poet

Boyar Iancu Văcărescu
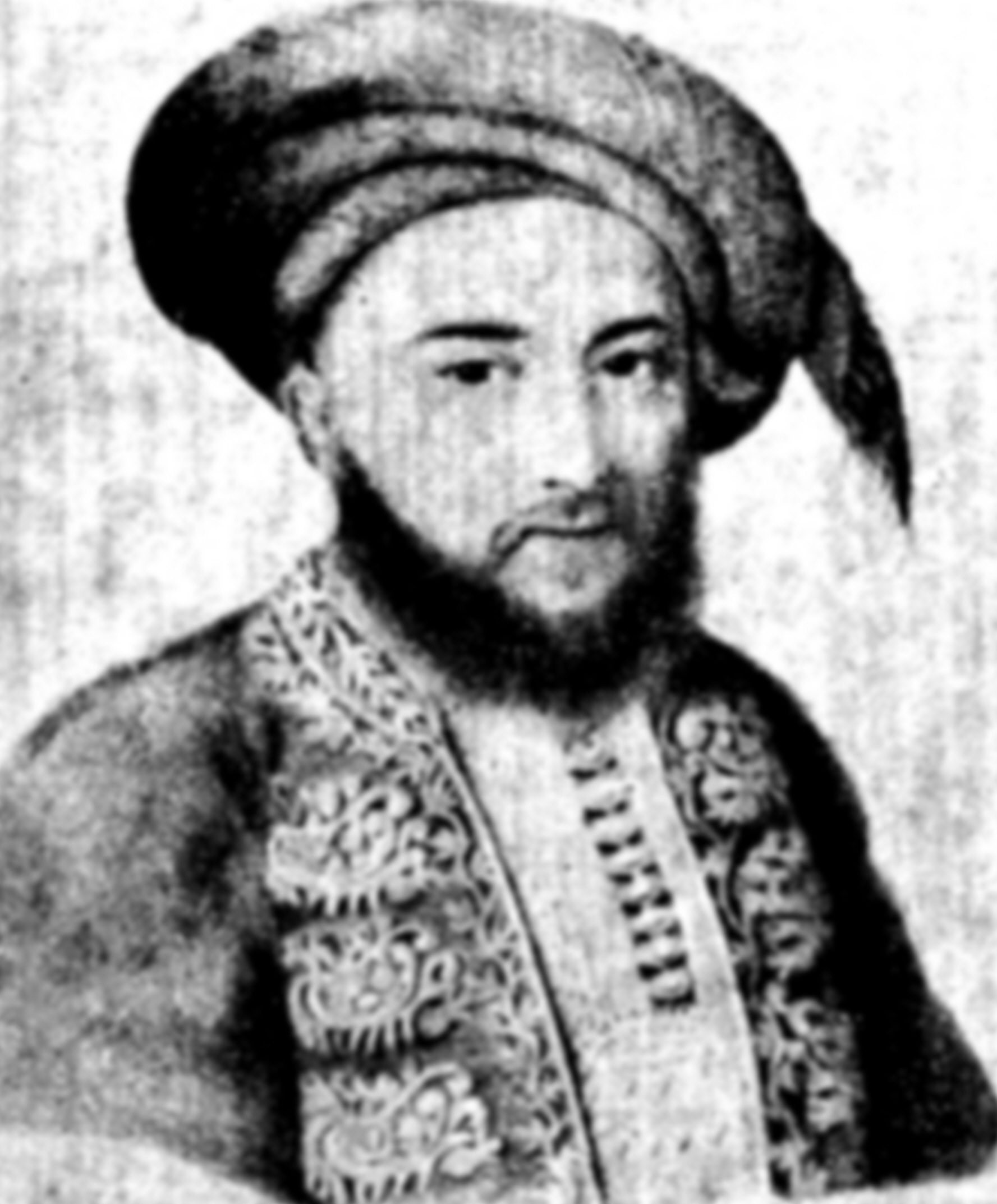
- Iancu Văcărescu (portrait by Henri de Mondonville)
- Born: 1792
- Died: 1863 (aged 70–71)
- Occupations: Poet, Translator
- Spouse: Ecaterina Cantacuzino-Pascanu
- Children: Misu "Claymoore" Văcărescu; Ioan Văcărescu
- Relatives: Elena Dudescu (mother); Alecu Văcărescu (father); Ienăchiță Văcărescu (grandfather); Elena Văcărescu (granddaughter)
- Writing career
- Language: Romanian
- Genres: Poetry
- Notable works: Poezii alese, Colecţie din poeziile domnului marelui logofăt Iancu Văcărescu

Iancu Văcărescu (1786–1863) was a Romanian Wallachian boyar and poet, member of the Văcărescu family.

== Biography ==
The son of Alecu Văcărescu, descending from a long line of Wallachian men of letters — his paternal uncle, Ienăchiță Văcărescu, was author of the first Romanian grammar; Iancu was the grandfather of writer Elena Văcărescu. He received a quality education not only in Greek (the preferred language of teaching in Wallachia at the time), but also in German and French, and was well versed in Western literature.

A patriot during the Phanariote epoch, he sided with the national movement in 1821 (around Tudor Vladimirescu's Wallachian Uprising), and assisted in establishing the Romanian theatre, translating many books and plays from German and French into Romanian, notably the Britannicus of Racine, a literary event of no small importance at the time. He inaugurated modern Romanian poetry. During the debates in the National Assembly over the drafting of an organic law for the Danubian Principalities (see Regulamentul Organic), Văcărescu spoke out against Imperial Russian overseeing, and was placed under arrest before being exiled for the following years.

Văcărescu was also one of the founders of the modern Romanian school system. He wrote philosophical poems, and ballads that found their inspiration in folklore. The first volume of verse he published was in 1830.

Before the 1848 Wallachian revolution, he presided a literary society (Societatea Literară) which served as a front for the radical secret association Frăţia.

Văcărescu died in 1863.

== Published books ==
- Poezii alese (1830)
- Colecţie din poeziile domnului marelui logofăt Iancu Văcărescu (1848)
