= Pârâul Vacii =

Pârâul Vacii may refer to:

- Pârâul Vacii (Curpătu)

== See also ==
- Văcăria River (disambiguation)
