= Văcărești =

Văcărești may refer to several entities in Romania:

- Văcărescu family of boyars
- Văcărești, Bucharest
- Văcărești Monastery
- Văcăreșteni, the founding circle of six leaders of the Romanian Iron Guard (later known as the "Knights of the Annunciation"), imprisoned in Văcărești and acquitted in 1924
- Văcărești Prison
- Văcărești, Dâmbovița, a commune in Dâmbovița County
- Văcărești, a village in Mihăileni Commune, Harghita County
- Văcărești, a village in Drăgănești de Vede Commune, Teleorman County

== See also ==
- Văcăria River (disambiguation)
- Văcarea (disambiguation)
