= Roseți =

- Commune
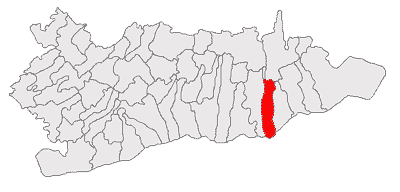
- Location in Călărași County

- Location in Romania
- Coordinates: 44°13′N 27°26′E
- Country: Romania
- County: Călărași

Government
  - Mayor (2024–2028): George Chiriță (PNL)
- Area: 70.82 km^{2} (27.34 sq mi)
- Elevation: 17 m (56 ft)
- Population (2021-12-01): 6,017
  - Density: 84.96/km^{2} (220.1/sq mi)
- Time zone: UTC+02:00 (EET)
  - Summer (DST): UTC+03:00 (EEST)
- Postal code: 917210
- Area code: +(40) 242
- Vehicle reg.: CL
- Website: comunaroseti.ro

Roseți is a commune in Călărași County, Muntenia, Romania. It is composed of a single village, Roseți.

Historical population
Year	Pop.	±%
2002	5,921	—
2011	6,070	+2.5%
2021	6,017	−0.9%
Source: Census data

At the 2021 census, Roseți had a population of 6,017.

== Natives ==
- George Alboiu (1944 – 2023), poet
