= Anton Chladek =

Romanian painter (1794–1882)

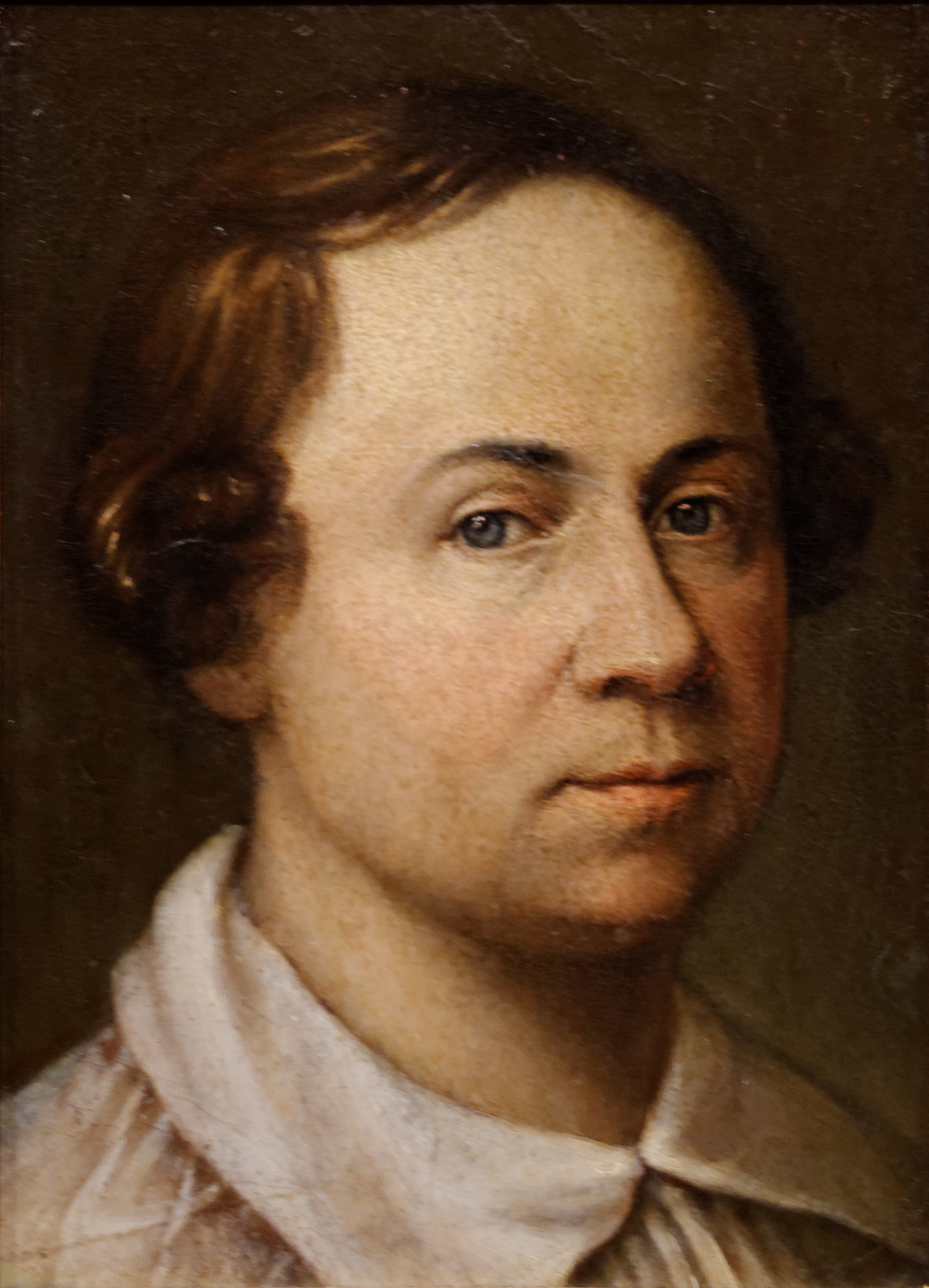
Self-portrait (1837/40)

Anton Chladek (1794 – May 1882) was a Romanian painter of Czech ancestry. He was known primarily for portraits in the Biedermeier style.

== Biography ==
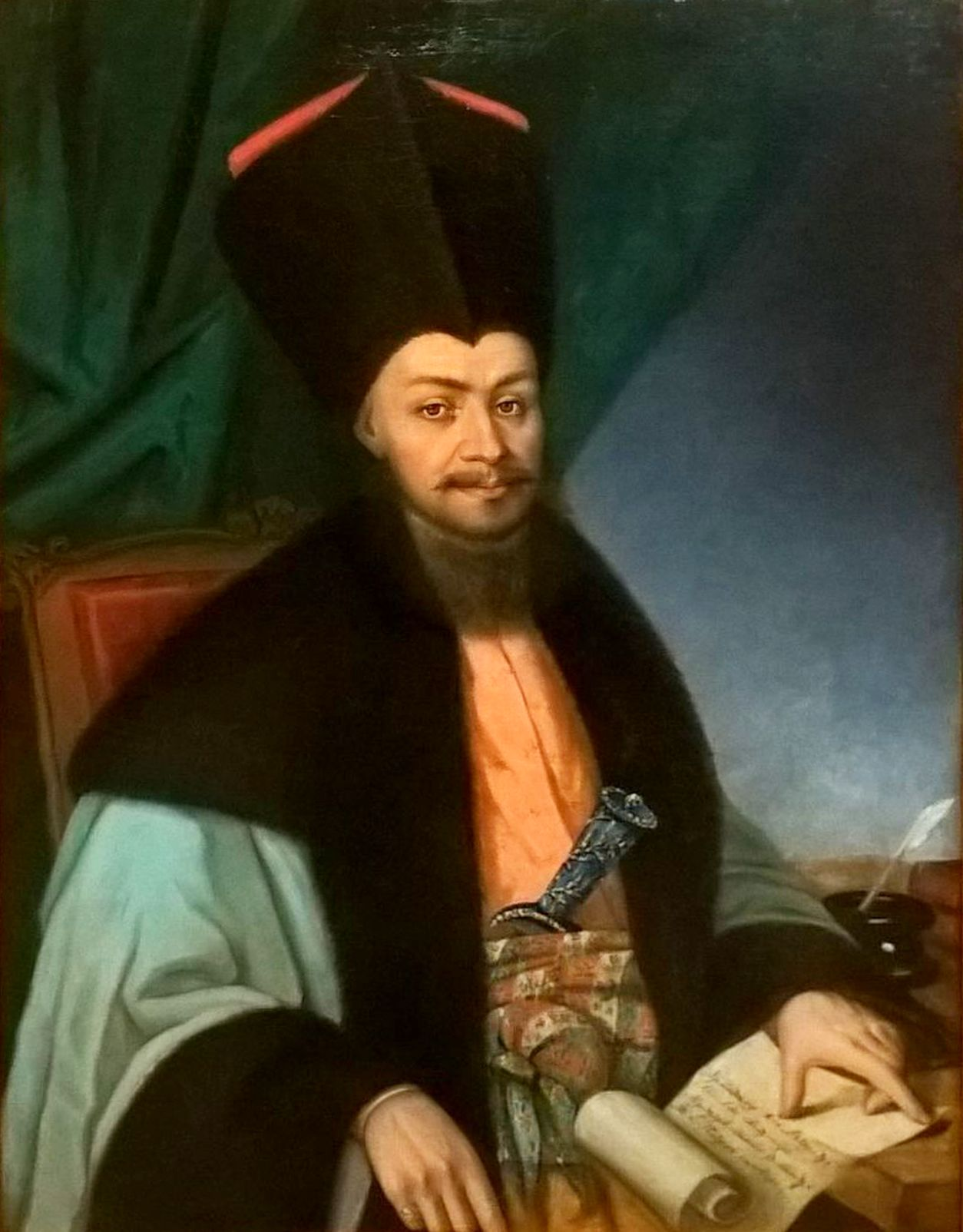
Posthumous portrait of the poet and historian Ienăchiță Văcărescu

Chladek was born in 1794 in Elemir in what is now Serbia, into the family of a blacksmith. Upon displaying some talent for art, his father sent him to Milan to study painting. There, he came under the influence of Correggio. From 1826 he worked as an itinerant portrait painter in Pest and Vienna, while continuing his studies. In 1833, when they had been completed, he settled in Pest and opened a drawing school.

Soon, he became a popular portraitist. He was known for portraits in the Biedermeier style. In addition to painting, he collaborated with several periodicals and almanacs as an illustrator. It was through those activities that he became acquainted with the young Hungarian artist, and later photographer, Carol Szathmari, who was working in Bucharest. Upon hearing of the great demand for portraits among the Romanian nobility, he decided to move there.

He arrived in late 1835 or early 1836. Thanks to his wife's dowry, he was able to acquire a large home with ample room for a studio. His ability to speak fluent French, German and Italian helped ease his introduction to the boyar aristocracy. In addition to creating portraits of prominent people and their ancestors, he gave art lessons to their children. The portraits were done in a variety of media and forms, including miniatures. He also painted icons and, in 1856, worked on church murals in Baloteasca and Budești.

During this time, he was assisted by his neighbor, Gheorghe Grigorescu, the brother of Nicolae Grigorescu, who would become Romania's most famous painter. At a young age (between 1846 and 1850), Nicolae paid visits to Chladek's studio, where he was inspired by the styles and techniques from Western Europe. As a result, he became an apprentice there and helped create icons for the church of Băicoi and the Căldărușani Monastery.

Chladek's eyesight weakened as he grew older, so he gave up miniatures and devoted himself entirely to large portraits.

He died in May 1882 in Bucharest.
