= Văcărescu family =

Coat of arms of the Văcărescu family

The House of Văcărescu was a boyar family of Phanariote Greek descent in Wallachia (now part of Romania).

The family produced the first poets in Romanian literature.

== Notable members ==
- Ianache Văcărescu (1654–1714) grand treasurer of Wallachia (killed with his master, Prince Brâncoveanu)
- Ienăchiță Văcărescu (1730–1796) poet, wrote the first Romanian grammar
- Elisabeta Văcărescu (1768–1866), second wife of Constantine Ypsilantis
- Alecu Văcărescu (1769–1798), poet
- Nicolae Văcărescu (1786–1825), poet
- Barbu Văcărescu (died 1832), the last Great Ban of Craiova
- Iancu Văcărescu (1786–1863), poet
- Marițica Bibescu (1815–1859), poet and Princess-consort of Wallachia
- Claymoor (Mișu Văcărescu) (c. 1843–1903), journalist
- Maurice Paléologue (1859–1944), writer and French diplomat
- Elena Văcărescu (1864–1947), poet
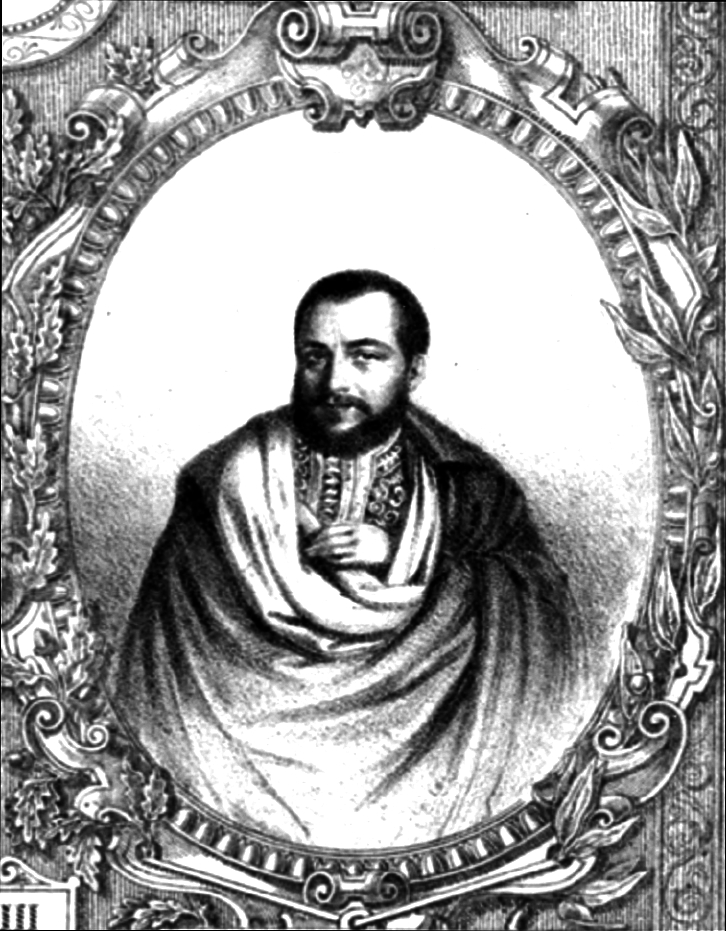
Iancu Văcărescu

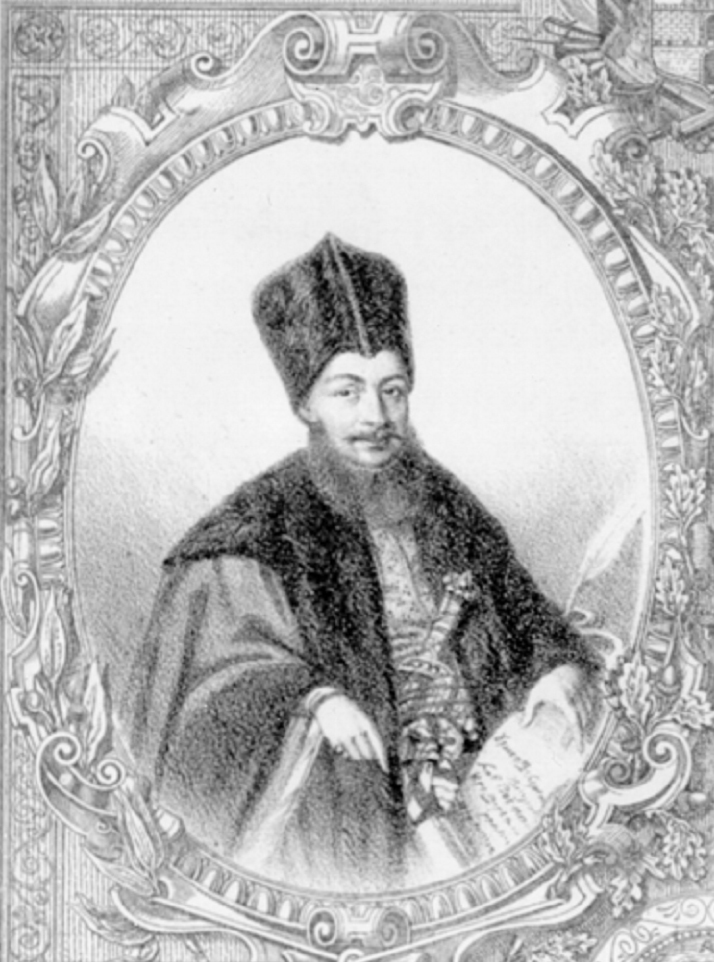
Ienăchiță Văcărescu

== See also ==
- Văcărești, Bucharest
- Phanariotes
- Văcărești (disambiguation)
