= Zoltán Böszörményi =

Romanian Hungarian writer, poet, journalist

Zoltán Böszörményi (Hungarian pronunciation: [ˈzoltaːn ˈbøsørmeːɲi]; born in Arad, Romania, Dec 18, 1951), is a Romanian-Hungarian poet, writer and editor.

== Life ==
He was educated in the city of Arad, graduating from High School No 3, (formerly known as the Catholic High School and now Csiki Gergely Főgimnázium) but he also spent a few years at a school of ballet in Kolozsvar (Napoca-Cluj).
He worked in the construction industry, and also had a teaching job in Kolozsvár. From 1975 till 1983 he worked as a proof reader for Vörös Lobogó, a daily paper.

After the publication of his first two poetry volumes he incurred the attention of the Romanian State Security Agency (Securitate). In order to avoid harassment he finally fled to Austria through Yugoslavia. He eventually emigrated to Canada.

He received a degree in philosophy from the York University of Toronto.

After the fall of Ceausescu regime, he returned to Romania and founded Luxten Company which became one of the most successful light source and street lighting manufacturer in the country. He was at the helm of the company until the end of December 2003. Since he dedicated his life only to literature.

== Literary works ==
His early poetic efforts were published in Napsugár, a children's magazine while he was still in school, but his career as a poet got started in Kolozsvár under the mentorship of poets Aladár Lászlóffy, Sándor Kányádi, Tibor Bálint és Sándor Fodor. His early poems and reports appeared on the pages of Ifjúmunkás, Előre, Korunk, Utunk, Művelődés, all Hungarian language publications in Romania. In Toronto he produced and broadcast a weekly one-hour Hungarian radio program. For two years he was a correspondent for CBC (Canadian Broadcasting Corporation).

His first volume of poem, Örvényszárnyon, came out in 1979 and the second, Címjavaslatok, in 1981, both in Bucharest.

Presently he is the proprietor of Nyugati Jelen, a daily Hungarian paper published in Arad for the Hungarian minority population of five counties in Romania. In addition, he is the editor-in-chief of Irodalmi Jelen, an electronic and print literary review designed to connect Hungarian minorities in diaspora with Hungary. He is also the founder (2001) of a publishing house of the same name.

Since the turn of the century his poetry books have been coming out with increased frequency and he has expanded into prose as well, producing several novels and short story collections. His prose works have been translated into several languages, including English, French, German, Russian, Polish, and Romanian.

His literary activities were rewarded with the József Attila Prize in 2012.

== Publication ==
=== Translated into English ===
- Far from Nothing - Paul Sohar, tr. Toronto. Exile Edition 2006.
- The Club at Eddy's Bar - Dublin: Phaeton, 2014

=== Original texts ===
- Vanda örök: Míg gondolom hogy létezem. Budapest. Ulpius-ház - 2005
