= George Alboiu =

Romanian poet (1944–2023)

George Alboiu (Romanian pronunciation: [ˈdʒe̯ordʒe alˈboju]; 6 July 1944 – 2 February 2023) was a Romanian poet.

== Biography ==
He was born in Roseți, at the time in Ialomița County (now in Călărași County), the son of Ion Alboiu and Florica, née Dima. He graduated in 1963 from the Nicolae Bălcescu High School in Călărași and then studied literature at the University of Bucharest between 1964 and 1969. His first poem, Luceafărul, was written in 1964 while at university but his first published work was Câmpia eternă (1968).

He died in Bucharest on 6 February 2023.

== Selected works ==
- Câmpia eternă (București, Editura pentru Literatură, 1968).
- Cel pierdut (București, Editura pentru Literatură, 1969).
- Edenul de piatră (București, Editura Cartea Românească, 1970).
- Drumul sufletelor (București, Editura Albatros, 1970).
- Joc în patru, poezii pentru copii (București, Editura Ion Creangă, 1970).
- Gloria lacrimei (București, Editura Cartea Românească, 1971).
- Cumplita apoteoză (București, Editura Cartea Românească, 1973).
- Stâlpi (București, Editura Cartea Românească, 1974).
- Poeme (București, Editura Eminescu, 1975).
- Poemele câmpiei (București, Editura Cartea Românească, 1978).
- Aventura continuă (București, Editura Eminescu, 1980).
- Metoda șoimului (București, Editura Eminescu, 1981).
- Turnir (1987).
- Roata lumii (București, 1994).
- Câmpia eternă, antologie, cu o prefață semnată de V. F. Mihăescu, București, 2001.
