= Văcăria River =

Văcăria River may refer to:

- Văcăria, a tributary of the Brătei in Dâmbovița County, Romania
- Văcăria, a tributary of the Pilug in Hunedoara County, Romania
- Văcăria, a tributary of the Putna in Suceava County, Romania

== See also ==
- Pârâul Vacii (disambiguation)
- Văcărești (disambiguation)
