= Ianache Văcărescu =

Boyar Ianache Văcărescu
- Born: 1654
- Died: 1714 (aged 59–60)
- Spouse: Stanca Cojescu
- Children: Radul Văcărescu; Barbru Văcărescu; Stefan Văcărescu; Balash Văcărescu
- Relatives: Ienăchiță Văcărescu (grandson); Barbu Văcărescu (grandson); Constain Văcărescu (grandson)
- Family: Văcărescu

Ianache Văcărescu was a Wallachian boyer who served as grand treasurer of Wallachia under Constantin Brâncoveanu. He was killed in Constantinople in 1714 alongside Brâncoveanu and his sons. Through his son Stefan Văcărescu he is the grandfather of poet Ienăchiță Văcărescu, through his son Radul Văcărescu he is the grandfather of Barbu Văcărescu and Constain Văcărescu. He is the first notable member of the Văcărescu family, whose descendants would be major contributors to Romanian grammar and literature.
