= Alecu Văcărescu =

Boyar Alecu Văcărescu
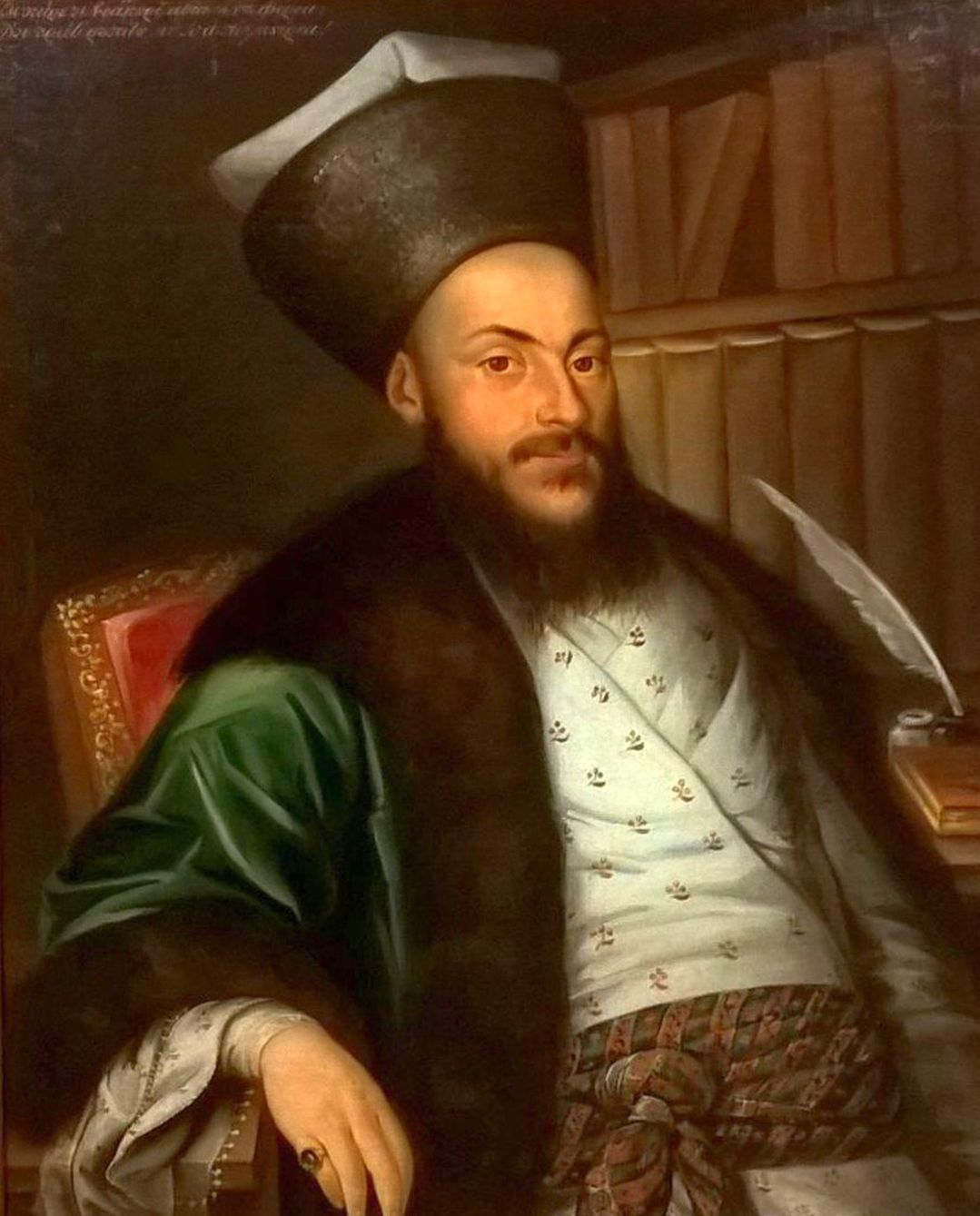
- Alecu Văcărescu; portrait by Anton Chladek
- Born: 1769; Bucharest, Wallachia
- Died: 1798 (aged 28–29); Constantinople, Ottoman Empire
- Occupations: Poet, Writer, Translator
- Notable work: Colecţii de poezii
- Partners: Elena Dudescu
- Children: Iancu Văcărescu
- Parents: Ienăchiță Văcărescu (father); Elena Rizo (mother)
- Family: Văcărescu

Alecu Văcărescu (1769–1798) was a Romanian Wallachian boyar and poet. Son of Ienăchiță Văcărescu, he was a member of the Văcărescu family that gave Romanian literature its first poets. In 1796 a collection of his poems appeared in Romania.

He died as a prisoner in Istanbul in 1798. His son, Iancu Văcărescu, was also a poet.

== See also ==
- Văcărescu family
