= Ienăchiță Văcărescu =

Wallachian Romanian poet and historian

Boyar Ienăchiță Văcărescu
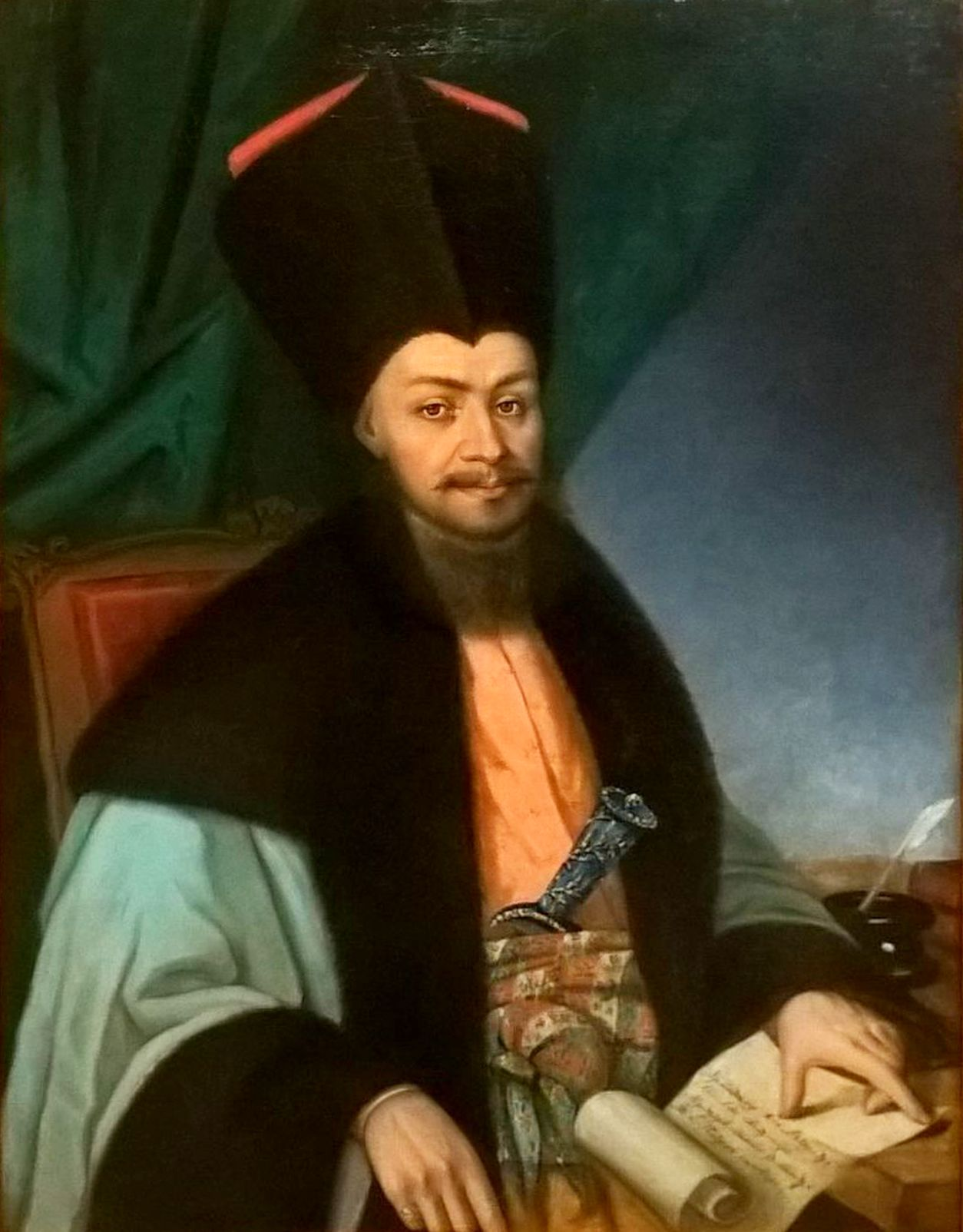
- Ienăchiţă Văcărescu, portrait by Anton Chladek
- Born: 1740
- Died: July 11, 1797 (aged 57)
- Resting place: Bellu Cemetery
- Occupations: Poet, Writer
- Notable work: Romanian Grammar
- Partners: Ecaterina Caragea; Elena Rizo
- Children: Nicolae Văcărescu; Alecu Văcărescu
- Parents: Stefan Văcărescu (father); Ecaterina Donca (mother)
- Relatives: Ianache Văcărescu (grandfather)
- Family: Văcărescu

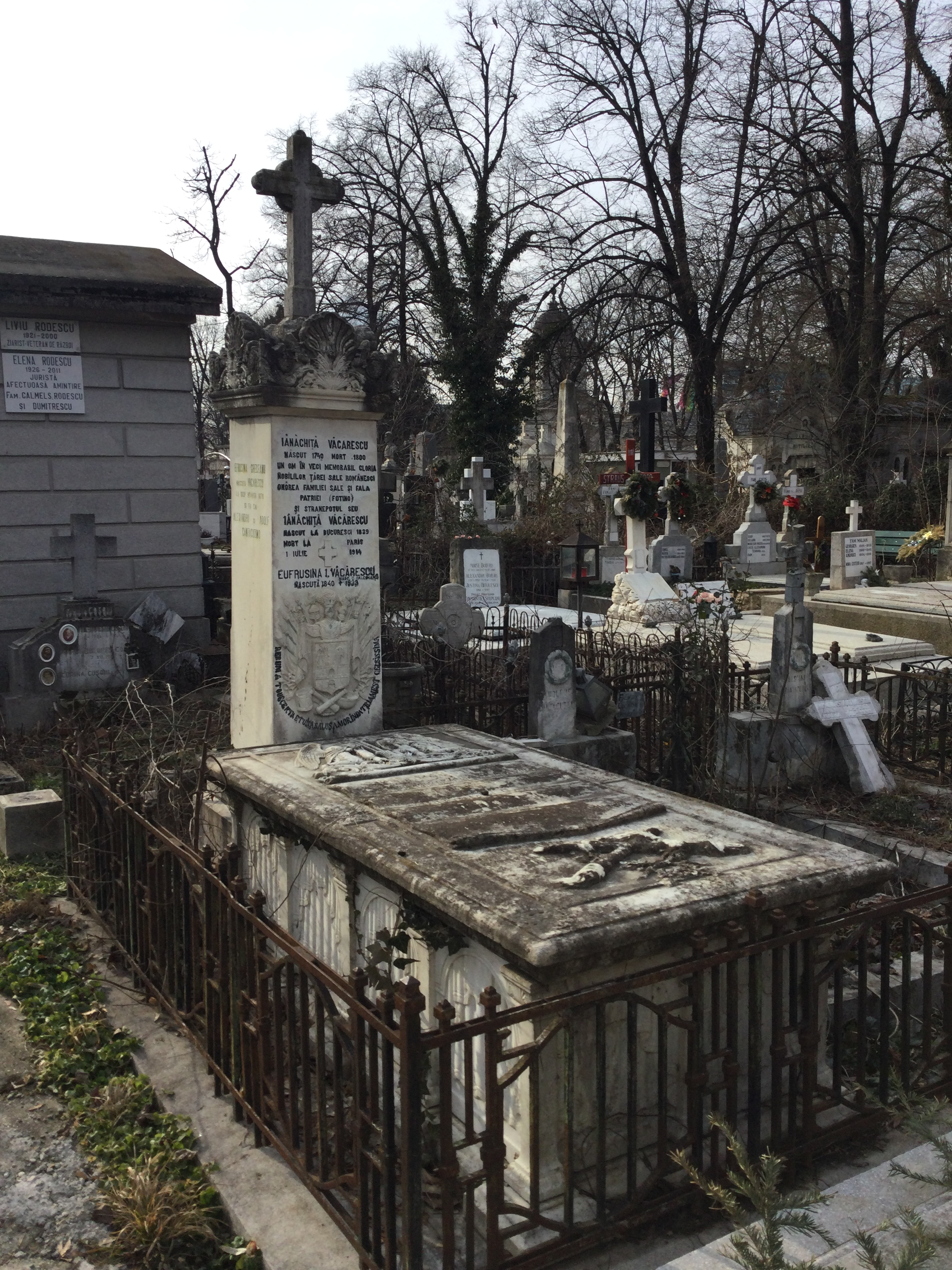
Grave at Bellu Cemetery

Ienăchiță Văcărescu (Romanian pronunciation: [jenəˈkit͡sə vəkəˈresku]; 1740 – 11 July 1797) was a Wallachian Romanian poet, historian, philologist, and boyar belonging to the Văcărescu family. A polyglot, he was able to speak Ancient and Modern Greek, Old Church Slavonic, Arabic, Persian, French, German, Italian, and Ottoman Turkish.

== Biography ==
Văcărescu wrote one of the first printed books on Romanian grammar in 1787, an edition which also included a section dedicated to the study of prosody; it was titled Observaţii sau băgări de seamă asupra regulilor şi orânduielilor gramaticii româneşti ("Observations or Reckonings on the Rules and Dispositions of Romanian Grammar"). He also completed a work on Greek grammar (Gramatica greacă completă).

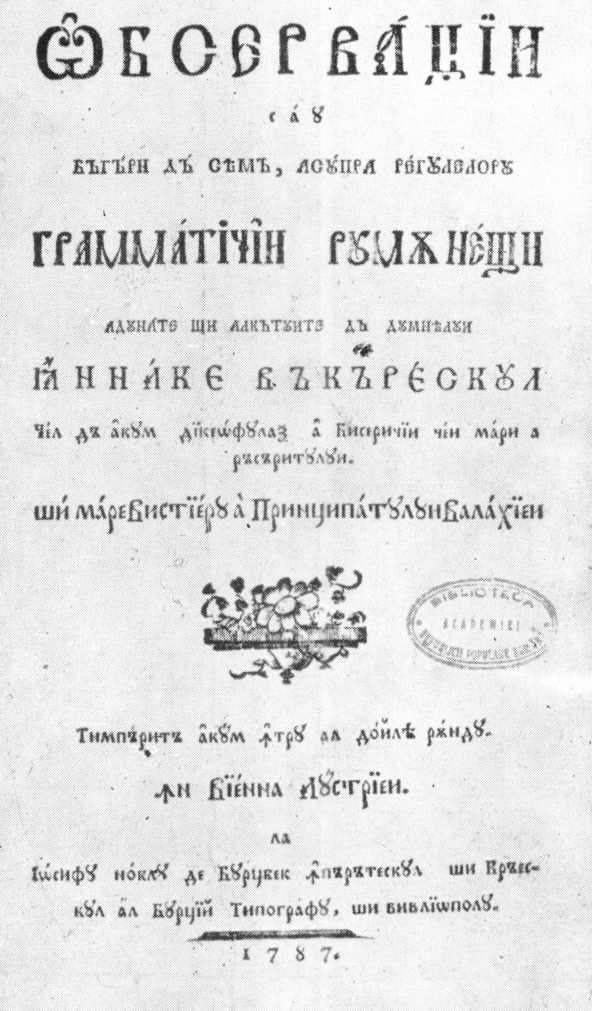
Ienăchiţă Văcărescu's Romanian grammar

Văcărescu's lyrical works take inspiration from both Anacreon and folklore, and center on romantic love. The best-known poems he left behind are Amărâta turturea ("Embittered Turtle Dove") and the minuscule Într-o grădină ("In a Garden"). Aside from these, he was also the author of a Istorie a Preaputernicilor Împăraţi Otomani ("History of the All Mighty Ottoman Emperors").

On several occasions, Ienăchiţă Văcărescu served Wallachia as a diplomat in missions abroad, including negotiations carried out in the Habsburg realms for the sons of Prince Alexander Ypsilantis to return after their 1782 flight to Vienna; he met and conversed with Emperor Joseph II, and also befriended the French ambassador, Baron de Breteuil. His impressive knowledge of Italian was the subject of a 1929 study by historian Nicolae Iorga, De unde a învăţat italieneşte Ienăchiţă Văcărescu ("Where Has Ienăchiţă Văcărescu Learned His Italian From?").
