= 1891 in literature =

This article contains information about the literary events and publications of 1891.

== Events ==
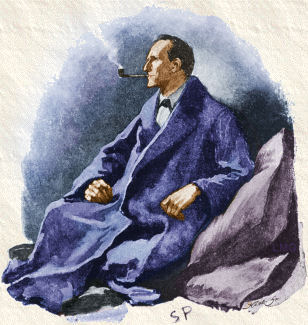
Portrait of Sherlock Holmes by Sidney Paget from "The Man with the Twisted Lip" in The Strand Magazine for December

- January – The Strand Magazine is first published in London. On June 25 Arthur Conan Doyle's private consulting detective Sherlock Holmes appears in it for the first time, in the story "A Scandal in Bohemia" (issue dated July).
- January 31 – Henrik Ibsen's play Hedda Gabler published in 1890 is first performed, at the Königliches Residenz-Theater in Munich, the city where it was written. The lead is played by Clara Heese (1861–1921), but Ibsen is displeased with her performance. The first British performance is on April 20 at the recently reopened Vaudeville Theatre, London, with Elizabeth Robins as Hedda and co-directing.
- March 13 – Henrik Ibsen's play Ghosts (published in 1881) achieves a single London performance, its English-language stage première (at the Royalty Theatre). To evade the Lord Chamberlain's Office's censorship, it has to be staged privately by the Independent Theatre Society, but still attracts strong criticism on moral grounds.
- April – Oscar Wilde's novel The Picture of Dorian Gray is first published in book format by Ward and Lock in London with the aphoristic preface originally published in the March 1 issue of The Fortnightly Review.
- May – William Morris establishes the Kelmscott Press as a private press at Hammersmith (London) and produces its first book, the first edition in book format of his fantasy novel The Story of the Glittering Plain.
- May 21 – Maurice Maeterlinck's play Intruder (L'Intruse) is premièred at Paul Fort's Théâtre d'Art in Paris.
- June – Profitable Advertising was established in Boston
- c. Late June – In a meeting of decadent poets in London, Oscar Wilde is first introduced to Lord Alfred Douglas by Lionel Johnson at Wilde's Tite Street home.
- July 1 – The International Copyright Act of 1891 comes into effect in the United States, permitting foreign authors to register their works for copyright. On July 3, the first such work, the play Saints and Sinners by English author Henry Arthur Jones, is registered.
- July 4–December 26 – Thomas Hardy's novel Tess of the d'Urbervilles is serialized in expurgated form in the weekly illustrated newspaper The Graphic (London); in November the first (unexpurgated) book edition is published in London.
- August 22 – Israel Zangwill's The Big Bow Mystery, the first classic full-length locked room mystery, begins serialization in The Star (London).
- September 4 – Ambrose Bierce dates the preface of Tales of Soldiers and Civilians for this day, although it will not actually be issued (in San Francisco) until 1892. It includes "An Occurrence at Owl Creek Bridge", one of his best known works.
- October – Tristan Bernard has his first work published in La Revue Blanche, which returns to Parisian publication this month, and adopts his pseudonym.
- October 9 – Émile Zola's stage adaptation of his novel Thérèse Raquin (first performed in 1873) achieves a single London performance, its English stage première (at the Royalty Theatre). To evade the Lord Chamberlain's Office's censorship it has to be staged privately by the Independent Theatre Society, but still attracts criticism on moral grounds.
- December – Thomas Hardy writes "The Son's Veto", which he regards as his best short story.
- December 7 – Maurice Maeterlinck's play The Blind (Les aveugles) is premièred.
- unknown dates
  - Sophia Alice Callahan's Wynema, a Child of the Forest is published, the first work of fiction by a Native American woman in English.
  - Publication of the first complete one-volume popular German translation of Shakespeare's plays
- probable – Edmund Clerihew Bentley, G. K. Chesterton and fellow pupils of St Paul's School, London, compose the first pseudo-biographical comic verses which become known as clerihews.

== New books ==
=== Fiction ===
- Grant Allen – The Great Taboo
- Hall Caine – The Scapegoat
- J. M. Barrie – The Little Minister
- Mary Elizabeth Braddon – Gerard; or, The World, the Flesh and the Devil ("by the author of Lady Audley's Secret")
- Gabriele D'Annunzio – Giovanni Episcopo
- Machado de Assis – Quincas Borba (translated as Philosopher or Dog?)
- Sophia Alice Callahan – Wynema, a Child of the Forest
- Arthur Conan Doyle – The White Company
- George du Maurier – Peter Ibbetson
- Helen H. Gardener – Is This Your Son, My Lord? (in The Arena)
- André Gide – Les Cahiers d'André Walter
- George Gissing – New Grub Street
- Thomas Hardy
  - A Group of Noble Dames (collected short stories)
  - Tess of the d'Urbervilles
- J.-K. Huysmans – Là-bas
- Henry James – "The Pupil" (short story in Longman's Magazine)
- Jerome K. Jerome – Diary of a Pilgrimage
- Selma Lagerlöf – Gösta Berling's Saga
- Jean Lorrain – Sonyeuse (novella)
- Lucas Malet (Mary St Leger Kingsley) – The Wages of Sin
- Herman Melville – Timoleon
- Georges Ohnet – Dernier Amour
- Daniel Owen – Enoc Huws
- Henrik Pontoppidan – Det forjættede Land (The Promised Land; publication begins)
- Howard Pyle – Men of Iron
- José Rizal – El filibusterismo
- Jules Verne – Mistress Branican
- Joseph Jeffrey Walters – Guanya Pau: A Story of an African Princess
- Oscar Wilde – Lord Arthur Savile's Crime and Other Stories
- Margaret L. Woods – Esther Vanhomrigh
- Charlotte M. Yonge
  - Two Penniless Princesses
  - Unknown to History
- Émile Zola – L'Argent

=== Children and young people ===
- Hedda Anderson – Rolfs sommarferier (Rolf's Summer Holiday)
- Selma Lagerlöf – Gösta Berlings Saga (The Story of Gosta Berling)
- Laura E. Richards – Captain January
- Molly Elliot Seawell – Midshipman Paulding
- William Gordon Stables – The Cruise of the Crystal Boat

=== Drama ===
- Carlo Favetti – Fusilir e granatir, un scherz comic (The Fusilier and the Grenadier: A Satirical Play)
- Jacob Mikhailovich Gordin – Siberia
- Maurice Maeterlinck – Intruder (first production)
- Henrik Ibsen – "Hedda Gabler"
- Victorien Sardou – Thermidor
- Rosario de Acuña – El padre Juan
- Frank Wedekind – Spring Awakening (Frühlings Erwachen)
- Oscar Wilde
  - The Duchess of Padua (first production)
  - Salome (written, in French)

=== Poetry ===
- William Morris – Poems by the Way

=== Non-fiction ===
- Mirza Muhammad Yusuf Ali – Dugdha Sarobar (The Lake of Milk)
- Marie Bashkirtseff – Lettres
- Black's Law Dictionary, 1st edition
- John Churton Collins – The Study of English Literature: a plea for its recognition and organization at the Universities
- John Gibson – The Emancipation of Women
- Edmond de Goncourt – Utamaro
- George Holyoake – The Co-operative Movement of To-day
- Frederic G. Kenyon (ed.)
  - Aristotelous Ἀθηναιων Πολιτεια: Aristotle on the Constitution of Athens
  - Classical Texts from Papyri in the British Museum; including the newly discovered poems of Herodas, with autotype facsimiles of MSS
- Errico Malatesta – Anarchy (L'anarchia)
- George W. E. Russell – The Right Honourable William Ewart Gladstone
- George Bernard Shaw – Quintessence of Ibsenism
- Grigore Sturdza – Lois fondamentales de l'univers (Fundamental Laws of the Universe)
- A. E. Waite – The Occult Sciences
- Oscar Wilde – Intentions

== Births ==
- January 7 – Zora Neale Hurston, American Harlem Renaissance novelist (died 1960)
- January 8 – (Margaret) Storm Jameson, English novelist (died 1986)
- January 9 – August Gailit, Estonian journalist and author (died 1960)
- January 15 – Osip Mandelstam, Russian poet and essayist (died 1938)
- January 22 – Antonio Gramsci, Italian Communist writer and politician (died 1937)
- January 23 – Pavlo Tychyna, Ukrainian poet (died 1967)
- February 10 – Elliot Paul, American writer (died 1958)
- February 13 – Kate Roberts, Welsh writer (died 1985)
- March 9 – Doris Leslie, English novelist (died 1982)
- March 13 – Felix Aderca, Romanian novelist, critic, poet and journalist (died 1962)
- March 27 – Lajos Zilahy, Hungarian novelist and dramatist (died 1974)
- April 13 – Nella Larsen, American novelist (died 1964)
- April 29 – Bharathidasan, Tamil poet and rationalist (died 1964)
- May 15
  - Mikhail Bulgakov, Russian novelist and playwright (died 1940)
  - Hjalmar Dahl, Finnish journalist, translator and writer (died 1960)
- June 14 – Alexander Melentyevich Volkov, Russian novelist (died 1977)
- July 5 – Tin Ujević, Croatian poet (died 1955)
- August 1 – Edward Streeter, American humorist (died 1976)
- August 12 – C. E. M. Joad, English philosopher and broadcaster (died 1953)
- August 25 – David Shimoni, Russian-born Israeli poet and writer (died 1956)
- September 18 – Rafael Pérez y Pérez, Spanish writer (died 1984)
- September 23 – Arthur Graeme West, English military writer and poet (killed in action 1917)
- October 6 – John Metcalfe, English writer (died 1965)
- November 14 – Josef Magnus Wehner, German poet and playwright (died 1973)
- November 17 – Sigurd Christiansen, Norwegian novelist and dramatist (died 1947)
- November 23 – Masao Kume, Japanese playwright, novelist and haiku poet (died 1952)
- December 9 – Maksim Bahdanovič, Belarusian poet (died 1917)
- December 10 – Nelly Sachs, German-Swedish poet, dramatist and Nobel Prize winner (died 1970)
- December 17 – Hu Shih (胡適), Chinese philosopher and language reformer (died 1962)
- December 26 – Henry Miller, American novelist (died 1980)

== Deaths ==
- January 13 – Mary Spear Tiernan, American writer (born 1835)
- February 3 – Élie Berthet, French novelist (born 1815)
- February 7 – Marie Louise Andrews, American editor (born 1849)
- March 13 – Théodore de Banville, French writer (born 1823)
- April 9 – Frederick G. Maeder, American playwright (born 1840)
- April 24 – Rebecca Agatha Armour, Canadian novelist (born 1845)
- April 27 – Joachim Oppenheim, Czech rabbi and author (born 1832)
- June – Teodor Boldur-Lățescu, Romanian journalist and publisher (born 1837)
- July 17 – Jean Lombard, French novelist (born 1854)
- July 19 – Pedro Antonio de Alarcón, Spanish novelist (born 1833)
- August 12 – James Russell Lowell, American poet and essayist (born 1819)
- August 22 – Jan Neruda, Czech writer (born 1834)
- September 15 – Ivan Goncharov, Russian writer (born 1812)
- September 28 – Herman Melville, American novelist (born 1819)
- October 15 – Gilbert Arthur à Beckett, English writer (born 1837)
- November 10 – Arthur Rimbaud, French poet (cancer, born 1854)

== Awards ==
- Newdigate Prize – Laurence Binyon
