= Teodor Boldur-Lățescu =

Romanian politician and polemicist (1837–1891)

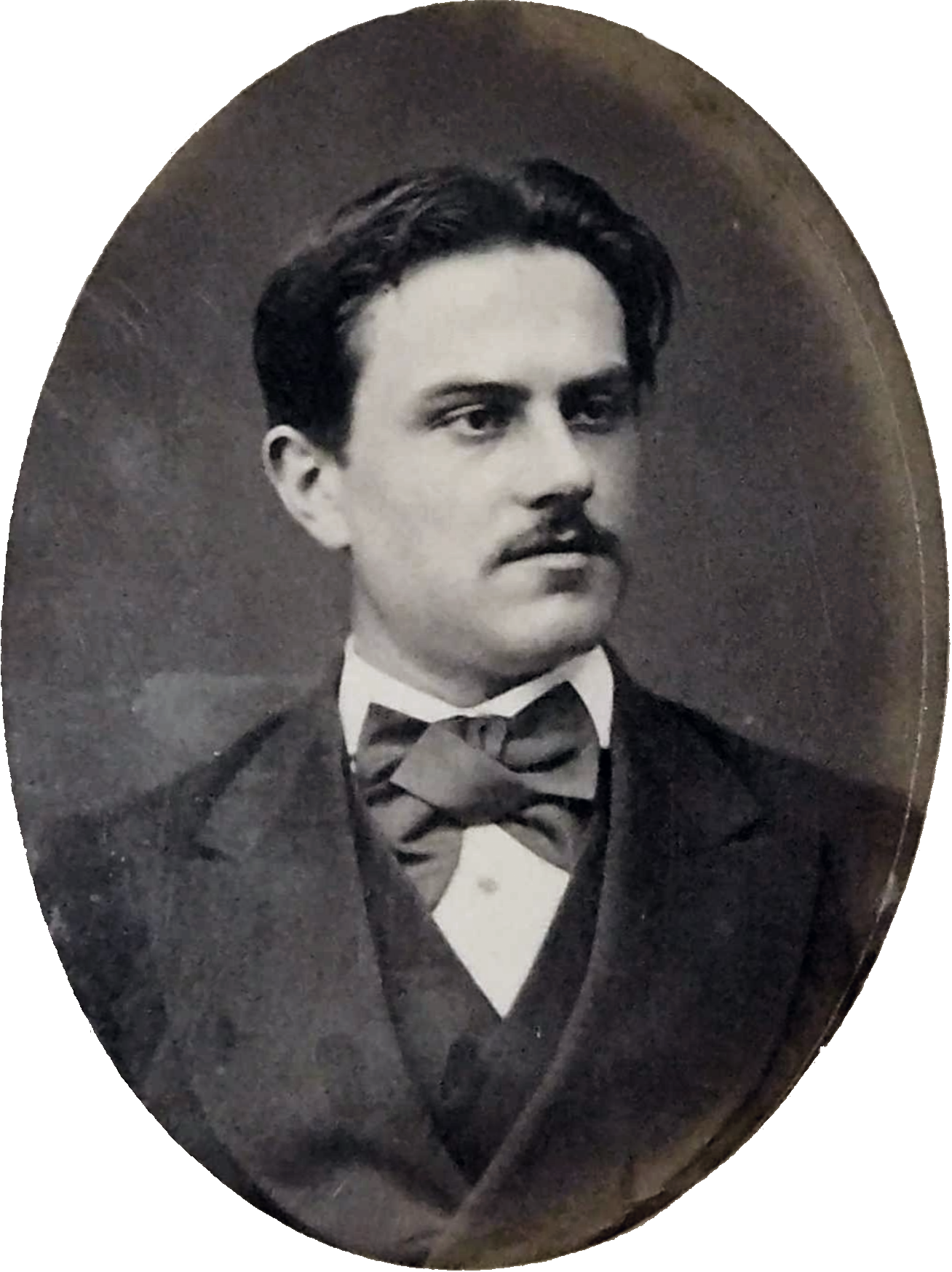
- Photograph of Boldur-Lățescu, by Jean Bielig

Prefect of Bolgrad County
- In office 1872–1876
- In office 7 February – June 1877

Prefect of Botoșani County
- In office March 1887 – April 1888

Personal details
- Born: 1837
- Died: June 1891 (aged 53–54) Iași, Kingdom of Romania
- Party: National Party (1856); Free and Independent Faction (c. 1870); National Liberal Party (1881–1891); Conservative Party (1891)
- Spouse(s): Olga Curt (div.?); Tereza Exarhu (div.); Ana Albu (div.)
- Children: Esmeralda Ceaur-Aslan; Eugenia Brăilescu; Olga Boldur-Lățescu
- Occupation: Lawyer, journalist, essayist, publisher, printer, satirist

Teodor Boldur-Lățescu ([ˈteodor ˈboldur ləˈtsesku]; also written Teodor Boldour-Lățăscu, Boldour-Latzesko, Toderiță Lățescu, or T. B. Lățescu; 1837 – June 1891) was a Romanian politician, essayist and newspaper publisher, best known for his violent advocacy of Moldavian separatism. Born into an ancient clan of Moldavian boyars, and claiming Montenegrin Balšić descent on his maternal side, he was unable to maintain his economic status, and eventually had to work as a lawyer. In his late teens, he debuted in politics as an adherent of the National Party, which sought to establish political ties between the Romanian populations of Moldavia and Wallachia. Boldur-Lățescu was disenchanted with the single Romanian state formed in 1859, emerging as an outspoken adversary of its Domnitor, Alexandru Ioan Cuza. His embrace of political separatism took a radical and controversial form, which included stereotyping Wallachians as Gypsies and circulating a historical forgery, the Chronicle of Huru. During the interregnum which followed Cuza's toppling by the "monstrous coalition" in February 1866, he joined a separatist caucus in Iași, convincing Nicolae Rosetti-Rosnovanu to claim the Moldavian throne.

On 3 April 1866, Boldur-Lățescu helped instigate the Iași separatist revolt, personally commanding armed citizens in resisting the Princely Lieutenancy and a Romanian Army-led backlash. These events, which resulted in many casualties on both sides, were widely believed to have been stoked by the Russian Empire and the Lipovan colony, though Lățescu later stated his anti-Russian sentiment. Arrested, then released, he continued to advocate for separatism even as his co-conspirators decided to no longer support it. His anti-Wallachian propaganda and his unrestrained criticism of Domnitor Carol I were regular features of the gazettes Moldova and Boldul, which he published in the late 1860s. In September 1867, Lățescu was assaulted by two Wallachian officers. Earning much public sympathy for his status as a victim, he was able to preserve separatism as a political cause into the 1870s. He was assaulted again in 1870, by police, after allegedly engaging in cruelty to animals at the Iași menagerie.

Shortly before the Romanian War of Independence, Boldur-Lățescu relaunched his political career as an ally of the right-wing politico Lascăr Catargiu. This took him to southern Bessarabia, where he served as Prefect for Bolgrad County. While there, he became noted as an adversary of the Bessarabian Bulgarians, but also as a critic of administrative abuse against civilians. Boldur-Lățescu, who launched several other newspapers and printing offices, was rewarded by Catargiu with a directorial position at Monitorul Oficial, the Romanian government gazette. Distancing himself from the administration in late 1873, he became a local ally of the National Liberal Party, which he joined in the early 1880s. Reconfirmed as Bolgrad Prefect, he was depicted by his critics as a habitual embezzler and vote-rigger, losing both this position and his seat in the Deputies' Assembly. The Russian annexation of southern Bessarabia forced him out of Bolgrad and into Neamț County, which returned him as deputy and also awarded him a seat in the Senate.

Within the newly proclaimed Kingdom of Romania, Boldur-Lățescu was noted as a skeptic of Moldavian regionalism and expressed loyalty toward Carol and his court; he was also involved in debates of Jewish emancipation, supporting full naturalization for only economically useful Jews. He eventually moved to Botoșani County, becoming its Prefect in 1887–1888. Though he also served as the National Liberals' branch leader, his rejection of any alliances with his old adversaries at Junimea pushed him into a conflict with this party. By the time of his death at age 53 or 54, Lățescu had joined the Conservative Party. His daughter Olga was a courtesan, infamous for her participation in a blackmail affair, which ended with her imprisonment in 1896.

== Biography ==
=== Origins and youth ===
Teodor Boldur-Lățescu was born in 1837; at that stage, Moldavia and Wallachia, the "Danubian Principalities", were ruled under Regulamentul Organic, a constitutional document which shared suzerainty of the countries between the Ottoman Empire and Russia. He belonged to the high-ranking boyar aristocracy, the first-born son of Gheorghe (or Iordachi) Costachi-Boldur-Lățescu (1798–1857), who in 1839 rose to the rank of Hatman in the Moldavian militia. Gheorghe had an older daughter, Esmeralda (or Didița), from his marriage to the Rosettești boyaress Eufrosina. Teodor's mother, Anica Balș (1820–1875) and Gheorghe had two other sons, Iorgu and Iancu, and daughters Olga and Evghenia.

A hypothesis put forth in the 1930s by Turkologist László Rásonyi identifies "Boldur", originally "Buldur", as a name of Cuman origins, which, according to historian Neagu Djuvara, could link the Moldavian family to the 13th-century nomadic confederation and its tribal aristocracy. The genealogical connection between the Boldur-Lățescus and the original Boldurs is not fully understood. In the 1840s, the scribe Iordache Mălinescu-Văleni endorsed a family tradition and circulated a genealogical tree which showed that the Costachis were descendants of Boldur, Vornic to 15th-century prince Stephen the Great. This is largely based on the observation that Boldur and the Costachis were both landowners in Epureni, and was received with enthusiasm by Costachi branches who added "Boldur" as their surname. The claim was revised in later scholarship, which only credits the family's attested lineage to the 17th-century Gavriliță Costache, also a Vornic, rendered notable by his partnership with Moldavian Prince Constantin Cantemir. More specifically, the Lățescus descended from Gavriliță's grandson, Clucer Gavril. The nickname "Lățescu" originated with his paternal great-grandfather, Spatharios Mihalache, evoking his ties with Lățești village—the sole estate he still owned at his retirement in 1816.

Through Anica, Teodor was the grandson of Hatman Teodor Balș, who viewed himself as descending from the Occitan House of Baux, through the Balšić dynasty, which had ruled in medieval Zeta. The claim of descent from the Balšićes was reviewed in 1844 by the Russian Office of Heraldry, who found it not entirely reliable. Genealogist Elena Monu argues that, whereas his father the Hatman was an avid agriculturist and social activist, who "helped the peasants on his estates in various ways", Teodor more closely resembled his Balș mother, who squandered a fortune in her lifetime. Memoirist Rudolf Șuțu argues that Anica was a careful entrepreneur, but attributes her misfortunes to her bad temper. He notes that she once pursued and physically threatened a judge who had ruled against her in a property dispute, and as a result had to spend time in prison. The story is backed by another raconteur, Dimitrie Hogea, who places it in 1864–1865.

Arms used by the Boldur and Costachi families

During the Regulamentul years, the Hatman answered to Russian governor Pavel Kiselyov. In April 1831, he rode with the Cossacks to quell a peasant revolt in Deleni. In the mid-1850s, the Crimean War took Moldavia and Wallachia out of the Russian sphere of influence, and briefly into that of the Austrian Empire. Esmeralda Boldur, by then married to General Nicolae Mavrocordat, offered her home in Iași to serve as an Austrian hospital. Moldavia was led through the post-Regulamentul period by a modernizing Prince, Grigore Alexandru Ghica. During this time the family, whether wittingly or unwittingly, became involved with promoting a historical forgery called Chronicle of Huru—generally seen as produced, in whole or in part, by Paharnic Constantin Sion. It was printed in 1856 by Gheorghe Asachi with funds from Lățescu's father the Hatman, whom philologist Demostene Russo identifies as a likely contributor to the forgery process itself. The text was flattering for the Boldur family, depicting its ancestors as directly engaged in the foundation of Moldavia, which the Chronicle pushed back to the early medieval period; it also induced the political goal of Moldavian distinctiveness, at a time when the two Principalities already seemed to be heading toward union.

=== From unionism to separatism ===
Hatman Costachi-Lățescu retired from the militia due to ill health in April 1856. A Romanian nationalist, he endorsed the idea of Moldavian–Wallachian union, and signed his name to letters of protest against the Caimacam (Regent) Toderiță Balș, who opposed it. At that stage, Teodor was adhering to similar goals. On 25 May 1856, he attended the unionist gathering of Socola and signed up to Petre Mavrogheni's National Party platform. Following protracted political battles, in 1859 the United Principalities were formed, with Alexandru Ioan Cuza as their first monarch, or Domnitor. In keeping with Cuza's program of educational reforms, as well as with their father's dying wish, young Boldur-Lățescu and his two brothers founded the Costăcească School of Hudești, which they paid for with agricultural revenue from their nearby estate. Teodor presented himself as a minor candidate in the legislative election of 1860, and was publicly mocked by writer Nicolae Gane for having set up an electoral committee with himself as president, secretary, orator, and only listener.

Teodor's first marriage, to Olga Curt, was registered in Dorohoi County in August 1863, making him the son-in-law of landowner Iancu Curt. The latter declared bankruptcy in early 1864, without having managed to cover his daughter's dowry. Several authors have described Lățescu himself as a "ne'er-do-well" (pierde-vară) and a dowry chaser. During those years, he was running in debt and losing some of his estates: in December 1863, the state authorities in Nichiteni had confiscated two of his oxen, and were selling them in order to recover his debt in local taxes; exactly two years later, his land in Bivolu was auctioned off "to satisfy his creditors", ending up as the property of the Goilav family. Young Lățescu soon came to resent the regime and was satisfied when a "monstrous coalition" of left-liberal "Reds" and conservative "Whites" engineered Cuza's abdication in February 1866. Appearing in public shortly after the coup had succeeded, he "thought it wise to demean himself" by entering the Iași tribunal hall, where he tore down a Cuza portrait, "took it with him on his sleigh, and went over to Saint Nicholas Church, where he buried it with pomp and circumstance."

Boldur-Lățescu made a publicized return as an anti-unionist in March–April 1866. The Principalities maintained unity under a Princely Lieutenancy made up of Nicolae Haralambie, Lascăr Catargiu, and Nicolae Golescu, but the political format was under stress. The subsequent riots were sparked by outrage over the Lieutenancy's search for a foreign prince to replace Cuza, and their eventual selection of Carol of Hohenzollern; in Moldavia, they turned to open separatism and the proposal to revive a Moldavian monarchy under Nicolae Rosetti-Rosnovanu. On the same day as Cuza's overthrow, a petition calling for a loose confederation to be restored between the two principalities was circulated among Moldavian boyars, and then sent to the European great powers. Commenting on this document on 26 February, Russian diplomat Andrey von Budberg concluded that "the overwhelming majority of Moldavians want disengagement [from Wallachia]." Historian Gheorghe Cristea contrarily sees the movement as "without echo within the large mass of the Moldavian population, yet strongly supported by Russia."

Cristea also notes that Rosetti-Rosnovanu was an "absolute non-entity, but very rich", while all his more prominent supporters, including Boldur-Lățescu and Nicu Ceaur-Aslan, were "people of no importance". According to Șuțu, the plot for a takeover of Moldavia was hatched during suppers at Rosnovanu's home. Iași monographer N. A. Bogdan claims that Lățescu and the others could persuade the more junior Rosonovanu that "one bold move on their part could spark a revolt in Iași—and even in Moldavia as a whole". On 21–23 March, the separatist cause was popularized by leaflets calling for the expulsion of Wallachian soldiers from Moldavia, as well as by a petition, signed by Asachi and others, which called for Europe to guarantee "the rights of the Moldavian people".

=== 3 April riot ===
The signal for an open rebellion was the move to appoint as Prefect Ștefan Golescu, the regent's brother, who was a Wallachian and entirely unfamiliar with the political scene of Iași; he was seconded by a third Golescu brother, Alexandru "Arăpilă", who was tasked with negotiating deals with the separatists. During such panel discussions, held at the Pogor House on 27–28 March, Rosnovanu and Boldur-Lățescu accepted the notion of a foreign prince, but noted that, if none was found in time, the union would need to be reexamined. Building on the argument that union risked turning Moldavians into Wallachian vassals, Boldur-Lățescu turned to slurs directed at the Wallachians and at the disgraced Cuza—as Cristea notes, his speech "lacked all sense of decorum." On 29 March, an incident sparked by Ceaur-Aslan and Nicolae Ionescu ended the negotiations. The Committee formed for supervising the upcoming legislative election was boycotted by the non-separatists, including by Vasile Pogor; Rosnovanu, Ceaur-Aslan and Boldur-Lățescu, running unopposed, became its organizers.

On the morning of 3 April, coinciding with Thomas Sunday, Boldur-Lățescu joined a delegation that also included Ceaur-Aslan, Orthodox Metropolitan Calinic Miclescu, and Constantin Moruzi Pecheanu, who visited Rosnovanu's home in Iași. They saluted the claimant's mother, to whom they communicated the "burning wish of Moldavia", namely that her son take the restored Moldavian crown. One account by Iacob Negruzzi places Boldur-Lățescu at the Metropolitan Cathedral, where he stood up on a table and delivered his "violent speech". His group, joined by men armed with clubs, firearms, and makeshift weapons, attempted to march on the Administrative Palace, which housed Catargiu and Prefect Golescu. They were pushed back by a unit of the Romanian Army, which, according to Negruzzi, took its orders from the poet-soldier Nicolai Skelitti—whose father, also a soldier, had joined the rebel camp as one of Rosonovanu's would-be ministers. Their attempted use of bayonets was fended off by the armed populace, with new separatist arrivals joining in the scuffle. They included Boldur-Lățescu's sister Evghenia, who arrived with her then-husband, Costică Aslan. Wearing a red rose in her hair, she "urged the people to advance on the soldiers, who would not dare [...] to take aim at their Moldavian brethren".

The eventual standoff took place in front of the Rosnovanu residence. Once here, government troops reportedly found themselves shot at by snipers inside the house, and withdrew. As reported by oral historian Radu Rosetti, the rebels followed them, "headed by Toderiță Lățescu, who killed or wounded several soldiers." The assault only ended when Captains Costiescu and Pillat ordered their troops to fire into the crowd, dispersing it without need for a second volley. The approval for this was reportedly arranged by two "Whites", Petre P. Carp and Carol Davila, after securing Catargiu's approval. Boldur-Lățescu reportedly managed to reorganize his men, "his head bandaged as if wounded, pistol in hand". A cavalry charge was planned by Carp, but stalled because of a Colonel Cornescu, who could not find his saddle. Major Pandraf was appointed commander, but the attack itself had little effectiveness, since Boldur-Lățescu and his followers had erected a barricade, which served them in engaging the horsemen in hand-to-hand combat. Resistance only subsided after the cavalry shot their pistols into the crowd. One of the soldiers involved, Grigore N. Ionescu, reported that the decision to fire took a while, and that the cavalrymen resorted to fighting in hand-to-hand combat. He personally subdued "Todiriță Lățescu", who had on him a banner reading "Long live Moldavia" and a revolver that he was shooting; the eventual charge was against another group of insurrections, led by the merchant Inge Rober.

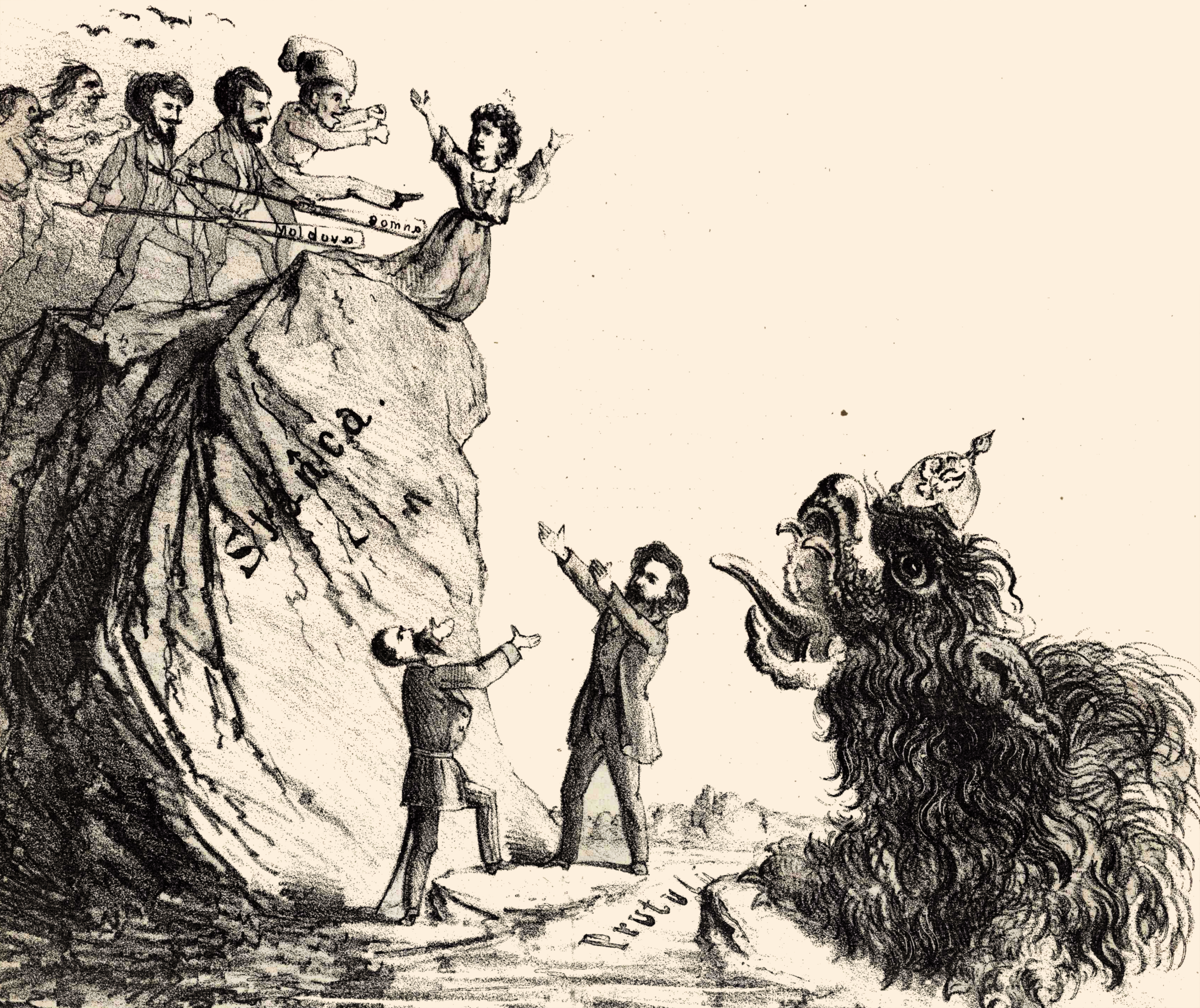
June 1867 cartoon in the "Red" magazine Ghimpele: Boldur-Lățescu and Nicolae Rosetti-Rosnovanu pushing Moldavia off the Tarpeian Rock and into the mouth of the Russian Bear. Prime Minister Ion Brătianu and War Minister Tobias Gherghely are shown attempting a rescue

Karl Goering, the Prussian Consul in Iași, estimated 150 fatalities of the events. His Russian counterpart, I. M. Leks, settled on 50 killed and 150 wounded, but later argued that this may be a gross underestimate. The precise number of victims was never communicated by the embarrassed authorities. This allowed Boldur-Lățescu himself to narrate the events as a Romanian St. Bartholomew's, in which he also included 400 arrests among the separatists. Ionescu described military canteens as "riddled with dead bodies", while Negruzzi acknowledges that the scene was "lugubrious. Even an hour later we could still see blood flowing and brains scattered on the cobblestones."

All leaders of the revolt (except Moruzi Pecheanu, who escaped) were arrested and transported to a prison, while the surviving rebel crowd was held at a makeshift camp outside the Administrative Palace. Boldur-Lățescu soon earned infamy as "one of the artisans of the Iași separatist movement" or person with the "most significant role in the Revolution of 3 April 1866", his "band" allegedly "composed mostly of foreigners". The latter claim is qualified by Cristea, who notes that the mob must have comprised "various honest people who were misled, mostly by their political perspective, narrowed down by a rigid local patriotism". Șuțu contends that over 1,000 people were involved on the Rosnovanu side, but that many of them were from the (Russian-speaking) Lipovan minority. Ionescu acknowledges that the crows "always grew in numbers", but reports seeing among them Greeks in fustanella and Rosnovanu's out-of-towners.

=== Moldova and Boldul ===
After his release from custody, Boldur-Lățescu maintained his support for Moldavian secession. During June 1866, Iași's correctional tribunal issued a citation in his name, announcing that he was due to stand trial for defamatory libel that August. In October, his separatist agenda was publicized in a bi-weekly political newspaper, Moldova ("Moldavia"), which he published alongside Iacobachi Stoianovici. Citing the verdicts of Russian diplomatic sources, historian Vladislav Grosul concludes that Boldur-Lățescu's paper was the "main organ of Moldavophiles at that time." The paper extolled Moldavian virtues and Moldavian heroes while serializing works of literature by Asachi and Costache Negruzzi. It also sought to "increase its public's antipathy toward Wallachians" by depicting these as "mountebanks" (saltimbanci) or as nomadic Gypsies (lăieși). Boldur-Lățescu also inventoried supposed differences in folkloric traditions between the two groups of Romanians: in one instance, he claimed that Wallachians were still celebrating each summer their 1653 defeat of the Moldavians, and also that they were imposing that celebration on the Moldavians themselves. Boldur-Lățescu argued that this was especially insulting, since it overlapped with the Saturday of Souls, a solemn religious festival, concluding that the two populations were "natural enemies".

Boldur-Lățescu's radicalism contrasted the political stances of other former rebels. In the snap elections in November, Rosnovanu was already running as a moderate, leaving Boldur-Lățescu as the only public partisan of Moldavia's secession—a position he reiterated when he publicly rejected the new constitution. His new brochure, Adivărul adivărat ("Truth and Nothing But"), published at Czernowitz in the Duchy of Bukovina, outlined his views of the 1866 riots. The document is also known for its "horrible expletives" against intellectuals who had gone public with their anti-separatism, including Titu Maiorescu. Its extraordinary claims against the authorities resulted in the owner's prosecution. He faced a sympathetic jury at the Iași Court, and used the opportunity to present his case against the government. He was ultimately acquitted on 14 December 1866. From April of the next year, Moldova moderated some of its goals: its nameplate featured mottoes calling for personal union under a foreign prince, with "legislative, administrative, judicial and financial separation" between the Principalities.

At the time, the United Principalities had a "Red" cabinet headed by Constantin A. Kretzulescu, who was able to caucus among the Moldavian autonomists. One of the latter, Alecu D. Holban, canvassed for additional support at Iași. Boldur-Lățescu intervened to announce that Moldavians were being "cheated" out of their remaining local rights, but found himself heckled. During summer 1867, Boldur-Lățescu experimented with satirical writing, putting out the short-lived humorous paper, Boldul ("The Pin"). This made use of provocative cartoons and lithographs, such as depicting the aurochs of Moldavia and a female figure representing the principality, both being pecked by crows; to these were added drawings which personally attacked Carol. They earned Boldur-Lățescu negative attention from Wallachian and monarchist soldiers stationed in Iași. Moldova, meanwhile, entered a polemic with the Wallachian leftist C. A. Rosetti and his Românul gazette. In June, Moldova claimed that Rosetti had pocketed 20,000 ducats from funds meant to ensure Cuza's toppling. Românul responded that the claim was pure libel, and that the 1866 conspirators had only ever had 5,000 ducats between them. It then returned with allegations of its own, namely that Moldova was a front for Rosnovanu's interests.

Also that summer, Domnitor Carol visited the Moldavian capital. Though he was well received in the house owned by Esmeralda and the Mavrocordats, Boldur-Lățescu and Moldova were again tangled in national controversy tied to this affair. The newspaper amplified an incident from the military parade, which saw Moldavian Lieutenant Dimitrie Donici snubbing Colonel Cornescu, a Wallachian. During the aftermath, Boldur-Lățescu provoked Cornescu to a duel, but, when the latter accepted, Boldur-Lățescu failed to attend the agreed location for the event. On 3 September, Boldur-Lățescu was severely injured at Iași's Hüttemann Circus. Reports in Dreptatea newspaper suggest that two Wallachian officers, Paris and Slătineanu, shouted fire in order to stage a panic, then pounced on Boldur-Lățescu, pummeling and possibly stabbing him. The matter generated a national controversy when it was suspected that the new Prefect, Ștefan Sihleanu, had encouraged the attack, and especially when Crown Prosecutor Ioan Manu asked the Court of Cassation not to try Paris and Slătineanu at Iași. The Court agreed and picked Focșani, which was Sihleanu's hometown and political fief. Many Iași citizens felt obliged to take Boldur-Lățescu's side, and a deputation, comprising landowner Grigore Sturdza alongside lawyer George Țigara, pleaded with Carol that he intervene to ensure due process.

Boldur-Lățescu reported his absence from the country between 27 September and 19 October 1867, with Moldova only putting out three issues in that interval. According to Românul, he was in a hospital until returning with a proclamation about the coming victory of separatism, in which he also scolded Sihleanu. For a few weeks, separatism appeared to regain popularity due to the perceived injustice against Boldur-Lățescu as a Moldavian. While discouraging this politicization of the attack, Gazeta's unsigned columnist declared himself indignant that police was still not in a rush to investigate the Hüttemann affair. Before the end of the month, Le Mémorial Diplomatique reported that the scandal was "used as a pretext by various ringleaders, who wished to spark a revolt. Their project was aborted, and an inquiry was ordered into this guilty maneuver."

=== Leaving Iași ===
Bogdan reports that, despite the sonorous opposition, the officers' trial was eventually moved to Focșani, "and got buried there, simply for ever, as had been intended". The suspects' only punishment, he notes, was to be relocated to more remote garrisons. On 3 April 1868, Moldova appeared with red lettering and an etching of human tears, in order to mark the second anniversary of the 3 April riots. The issue explicitly accused Catargiu and Davila of being mass murderers. Later that month, Carol visited the Moldavian city again and stayed at the Rosnovanu house. According to Bogdan, Boldur-Lățescu retorted with an unsigned piece in the gazette Convențiunea, which claimed that Carol had cheated his Moldavian subjects, exposing the region and its capital to more severe exploitation.

In July 1868, Moldova was reissued from Bacău and printed in Focșani, but returned to Iași before the end of that month. During August, it featured its publisher's definitive attack on C. A. Rosetti, as well as a promise (never fulfilled) that Moldova would also feature a French-language weekly edition, which was meant to publicize Romania's decay to an international audience. Also that year, Boldur-Lățescu published a translated edition of Dimitrie Cantemir's 1710s tract, Descriptio Moldaviae, as Scrisoarea Moldovei—based on the 1825 translation made at Neamț Monastery. He wrote the preface, which included his musings about the Moldavians being unfamiliar with their "ancient splendor", in which he identified the source of their political apathy. As noted by historian Andrei Pippidi, his preface has similarities with Sion's writings, including libelous claims about the genealogy of various boyar houses such as his Pillat adversaries.

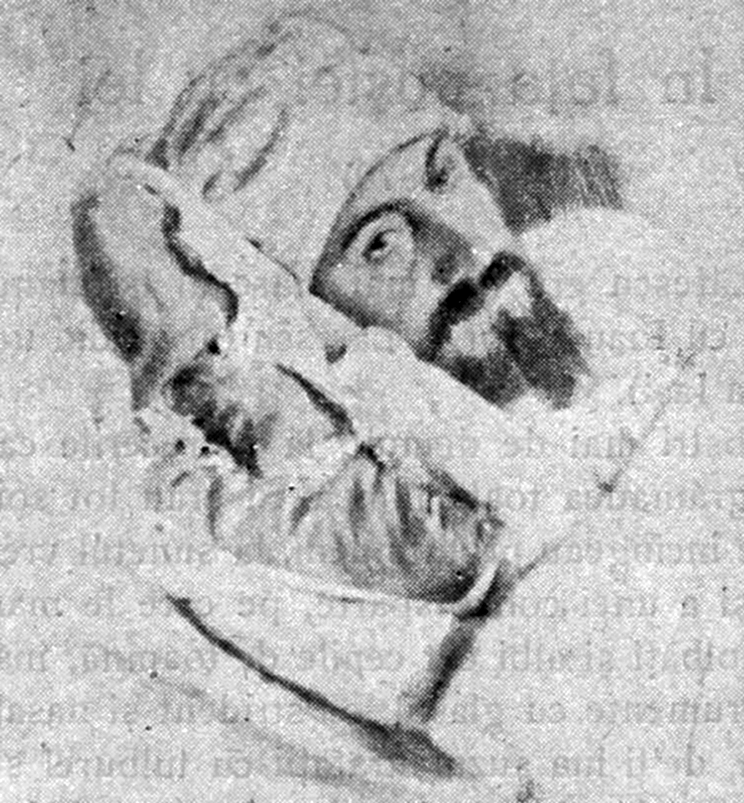
Boldur-Lățescu in 1870, while recovering from his fracas with police

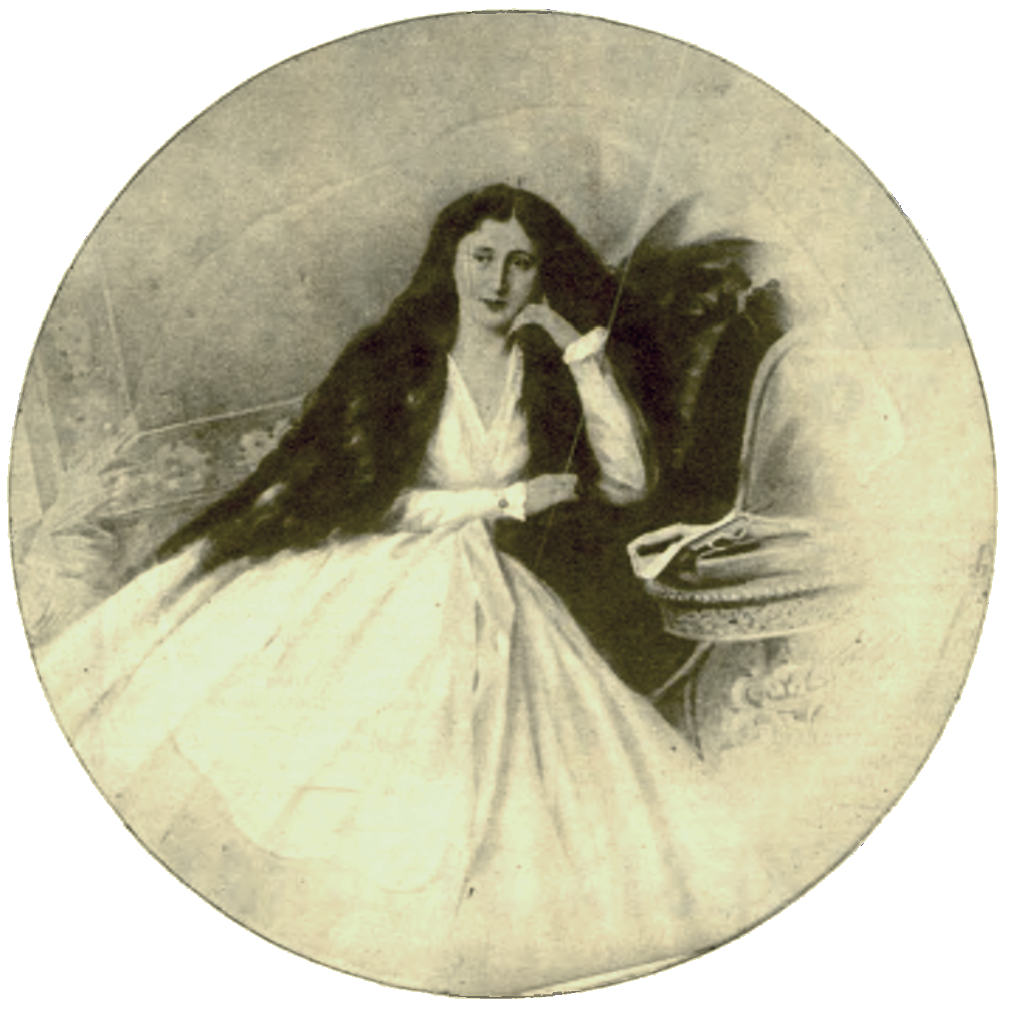
Boldur-Lățescu's sister, Evghenia Aslan, in the early 1870s

In 1867, Anica Boldur settled outstanding gambling debts by selling Mărăței mahala, a part of Piatra city that she had owned to her name. Teodor trained as a lawyer and registered with the bar association in Iași, marrying and divorcing a boyar lady, Tereza Exarhu. During early 1870, he was handling legal affairs for Mantu Daraban, and went public with claims that Daraban was a victim of corrupt practices by other lawyers, including Dimitrie Cornea. This prompted a disciplinary probe by the bar association, which ruled that Lățescu's allegation was "wholly inexact"; it also noted that Lățescu himself was "not included on any table of Romanian lawyers", and therefore that no disciplinary sanction against him was needed.

In 1871, Lățescu married the heiress of a timber trade merchant, Serdar Nicolae Albu, whose family controlled the politics of Piatra. This unhappy marriage ended in divorce, after the groom was found to be squandering Albu's assets. Beset by financial troubles, Boldur-Lățescu ended the publication of Moldova in 1869. At the time, he had leased Elena Berman's printing press and was using it to put out Vasile Botez's newspaper, Secolulŭ al Noue-spre-zecele. Șuțu reports that Boldur-Lățescu was mostly abroad, in Russia and in Istanbul, before deciding to return "to live among his own kind, at Iași." His younger brother Iorgu was fully reconciled with the political regime, and served as a perennial Prefect of Police in Iași, where a street was named after him. He may have been Prefect during an 1870 episode in which his brother fought with law enforcement. As reported by Șuțu, this came when Toader visited a menagerie and proceeded to pester, then prod at, the lions on display. Due to his "herculean strength", it took 50 police agents to physically subdue him. Bruised and bloodied, he asked for his photograph to be taken and kept by the Boldurs as a memento of the day.

=== Dorohoi and Bolgrad ===
According to literary historian Augustin Z. N. Pop, Boldur-Lățescu should be counted as an affiliate of the Free and Independent Faction, the political party which still coalesced Moldavian separatists and federalists. He returned in March–November 1871 as owner and editor of Echoul Munților ("Mountain Echoes"). Switching offices between Piatra and Iași, it may be considered the last of Moldavia's separatist gazettes. He was at the time based in Neamț County, which he successfully represented in the Deputies' Assembly after elections in May 1871.

From May 1872, Lățescu began serving as Prefect of Dorohoi County, in northern Moldavia, replacing Grigore Ventura, who was being investigated for embezzlement. He owed his appointment to a government headed by his former enemy Catargiu, the irony of which was commented upon in the press. According to Telegraphul daily, "here was Mr Boldur Lățescu asking to be made prefect of a district precisely by that executioner [emphasis in the original] of Moldavia whom he had turned in to public vindication, and the executioner himself, whether as a mockery of Mr Boldur Lățescu, or because he was afraid of him, now made him prefect of Dorohoi district." The same paper claimed that Lățescu showed his loyalty toward Catargiu by banning all local mayors from even discussing politics. A legend consigned to paper by Dumitru Constantinescu-Teleormăneanu reports that Lățescu had proceeded to apply laws which prevented Jewish immigrants from entering the local villages. The local Jews allegedly tried to bribe him into changing his mind; when he refused, they sent the bribe to his superiors, who accepted it, prompting Lățescu to resign in protest.

At some point in 1872, Boldur-Lățescu was assigned Prefect of Bolgrad County in southern Bessarabia, which was largely peopled by Bessarabian Bulgarians. His continued support for Catargiu was again reviewed as unusual, given his background in separatism: satirists at Ghimpele noted that Boldur-Lățescu had turned into a "fiery defender of the dynasty". Contrarily, Telegraphul noted that Lățescu had been moved after alienating the Dorohoi electorate, and that he regarded Bolgrad County as a place of exile, absenting for months on end. Like the Factionalist Holban, Lățescu eventually moved his law practice, joining the bar association shared between Bolgrad and Ismail. From July 1872 to May 1873, the former city housed his printing press, Echoulŭ Bolgraduluĭ. It put out a newspaper of the same name, owned by Boldur-Lățescu and curated by Basile Brănișteanu. A newspaper called Flagelulŭ ("The Scourge"), which appeared at Ismail and Bucharest for a while after October 1873, may have also been put out by Boldur-Lățescu.

During 1874, Lățescu was issuing another periodical, named Ecoulŭ Basarabieĭ ("Bessarabia's Echo"). In his letters to Christian Tell, the Minister for Religious and Educational Affairs, he noted his resentment for the Bulgarian community, which he saw as won over by pan-Slavism and Russophilia. He was especially adverse to the Inspection Committee of Bulgarian Schools, alleging that its members were habitual embezzlers and traffickers of influence, and expressing his dismay that two board members could not speak either Romanian or proper Bulgarian. In December 1874, he leased 10 desyatinas (1.9 hectares or 4.7 acres) of state agricultural land in the village of Caracurt.

As early as July 1873, Boldur-Lățescu had complained to Catargiu that Bolgrad was being governed with brute force, including the "arbitrary arrests [of] innocent people"—according to Telegraphul, he was abruptly told not to interfere with this state of affairs. He was eventually moved to a more central position: between 1 and 30 November 1873, he was the editor in chief of Monitorul Oficial, the Romanian government gazette, while also collecting a salary as director of the State Printing Office. According to Ghimpele, Lățescu was pushed to resign from these offices by Catargiu, after visiting the provinces and documenting forms of government abuse that he encountered there; Românul "stole the paper" and published it. Ghimpele also noted the Lățescu's surprising conversion from a "friend [and] supporter" of Catargiu to one who "reprimanded" Catargiu's government.

=== National Liberal figure ===
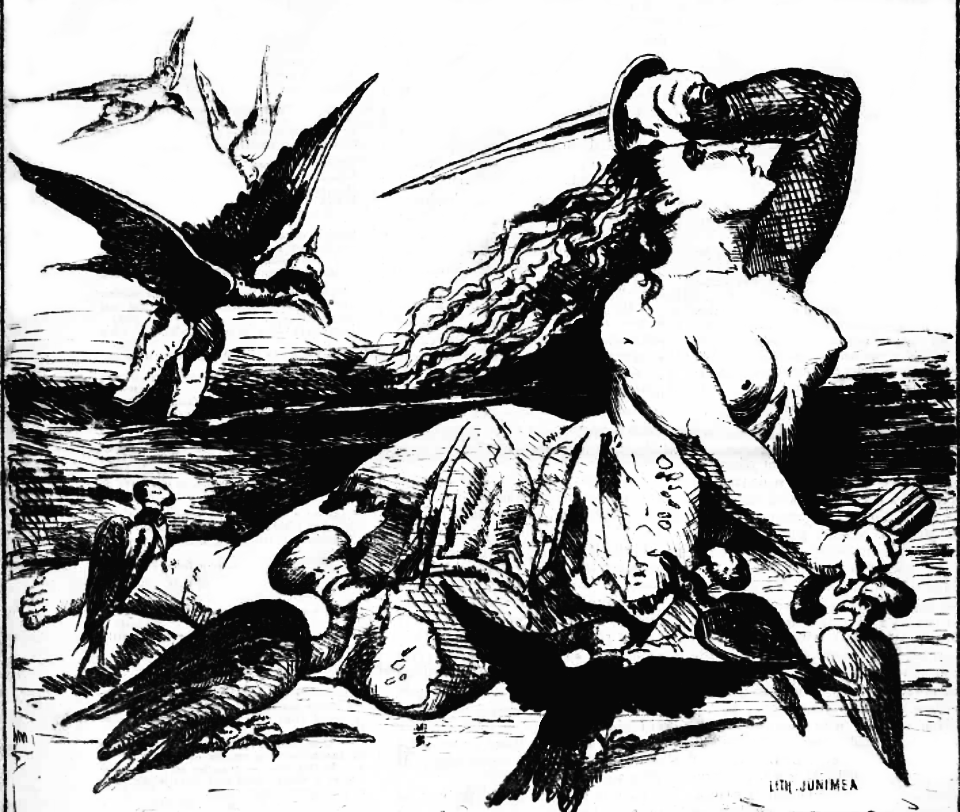
April 1874 cartoon in the "Red" magazine Asmodeu: Romania as a young warrior, stripped down by boyar raptors and the Prussian eagle

In the June 1876 election, Boldur-Lățescu ran for the Assembly as an ally of the National Liberal Party, which coalesced the opposition to Catargiu's "Whites". Emerging as Prime Minister from this National Liberal sweep, Ion C. Brătianu applauded Lățescu's "staunch opposition to the past regime". Boldur-Lățescu took the 3rd College of Bolgrad by 124 votes to Aristid Pascal's 100. He resigned shortly after, on 7 February 1877, to return as Bolgrad's Prefect upon Brătianu's recommendation. He then presided over the 3rd College seat snap election, in which he was the winning candidate. He engaged in massive electoral fraud, for which he was reprimanded by the Assembly on 9 June 1877; the election itself was annulled by a majority vote in chamber. He complained about this in a letter to the Assembly, which outlined his defense. He contended that, as a "man of no financial means", he could not be credibly accused of buying off voters; he also noted that the only violence in Bolgrad had been that of "my and my nation's most unrelenting enemies". Lățescu also mentioned that, as proof of his genuine popularity, he had since also been elected to Bolgrad's administrative council.

The 1870s saw the emergence and success of Iași's anti-separatist conservative club, Junimea, which grouped some of Lățescu's known adversaries, including Maiorescu, Pogor, Skelitti and Carp. At the time, Moldavians were rallying with the cause of Romanian nationalism, which led to them supporting the Romanian War of Independence (1877–1878): Rosnovanu enrolled as a volunteer, while Evghenia Boldur, married Conduratu, was a decorated nurse. Also in June 1877, at the height of the war, Boldur-Lățescu was sacked from the Bolgrad Prefecture. An unsigned letter in the "White" daily România Liberă claimed that this was to the "general satisfaction" of Bolgrad citizens. The letter alleged that the outgoing Prefect had taken bribes to facilitate the naturalization and public employment of foreigners. He was successful in his bid for the 3rd College of Neamț in the May 1879 election. While at Piatra, he put out another short-lived newspaper, Mișcarea Liberală ("The Liberal Movement", 1879–1880), "which created much scandal and discord within the liberal party"; he also replaced Theodor Dornescu as commander of the Neamț Civic Guard. During the by-elections of August, Lățescu moved again to the 3rd College seat of Bolgrad, though, as România Liberă reported, his election had widespread irregularities that should have invited a recount. Some records suggest that he was still committed to the project of Moldavian sovereignty: Pippidi notes that a reprint of the Huru forgery, which appeared in 1879 at Focșani, was probably financed by him or, alternatively, by Alexandru Asachi.

The representation of Bolgrad in the Assembly was abruptly ended when Romania agreed to cede all of southern Bessarabia to the Russian Empire. By March 1880, Boldur-Lățescu had retaken his Neamț seat. România Liberă's Bolgrad correspondent, commenting on these developments, suggested that Lățescu would still continue his trading in Romanian passports, by catering to the mass of Bessarabian Jews who stood ready to emigrate to Romania. Before January 1881, he had joined Brătianu's National Liberals. During this interval, his party had been pushed into the opposition. As reported by România Liberă, "the Reds' irritation" with this arrangement could be measured in Lățescu's claim that "intelligence itself was insulted" by the assignment of a cabinet position to Alexandru Teriachiu. He was reconfirmed as Neamț deputy for the 4th College in the April 1883 elections, part of a National Liberal sweep; he himself took 287 votes out of 300.

This final period of Boldur-Lățescu's career saw the country being created a Kingdom of Romania, still under Carol of Hohenzollern (who was crowned King). He resumed his participation in the disputes between liberal factions, attacking Mihail Kogălniceanu for his "Catonism" and criticizing the National Liberal government for errors in defining liquor licenses. In January 1882, an irate Kogălniceanu asked others to refrain from ever mentioning his and Lățescu's names together. Kogălniceanu was again upset when Lățescu advocated budgetary restraint, and sought to reduce the pension of General Mihail Cerchez during an Assembly vote in 1882. During the debates, Lățescu complained that Kogălniceanu's speech had made oblique references, which he qualified as "correct expressions, but terrible allusions", to his own political stances. During April–May, the two Moldavian politicians clashed again, when Lățescu tried to raise awareness of the new civil list set aside for the newly founded State Railways Company. He publicized the manager's 36,000-francs salary, which he found exorbitant. Lățescu proposed a reduction of 34,000 francs, equivalent to salaries paid by the private-run Lemberg–Czernowitzer Eisenbahn. In June 1884 he co-sponsored legislation which set aside a Crown Estate for the monarch and his family.

=== Final dissidence ===
At that stage, Boldur-Lățescu's split from Moldavian autonomists such as Nicolae Ionescu was manifest when he refused to support tax rebates for Iași, which had been a point of policy since the 1860s. He argued that the debate had grown stale, and that Iași was already more privileged than other Moldavian communes. Ionescu declared his astonishment that Lățescu, the "O'Connell of Iași's outskirts", had not only "moved camp to the unionist side", but was also turning his back on the Moldavian capital city. Lățescu was also active in the debates over Jewish emancipation and assimilation, being skeptical of both. Speaking in front of the Assembly in March 1884, he criticized government for extending naturalization to "Israelite" bancheri și zarafi ("bankers and loan sharks"), instead of prioritizing "scientists and tradesmen" from the same community. Jewish journalist Moses Schwartzfeld quoted this assessment as a revelation into the corrupt nature of naturalization laws.

Boldur-Lățescu switched to the Neamț Senate seat, 2nd College, during the race of November 1884, also serving as senatorial financial inspector (Chestor) from 1 March 1886. During this full term, which lasted to 1888, he continued to advocate checks on Jewish emancipation. In January 1887, he claimed to have received documentation on the "non-territorial Jews who had infiltrated the officers' corps under false names." The Jewish community analyzed the three names he had advanced as evidence, concluding that one, Cruceanu, was in fact a Christian; another one, Iosef Simionescu, was a decorated veteran of the 1877 war (and therefore granted naturalization); while a third one, Gherini, seemed not to exist at all.

Boldur-Lățescu increased his estate in Iași in December 1885, when he leased "in perpetuity" a vacant lot on Sărăriei Street. Some of his final years were spent in Botoșani County, where he served as Prefect from March 1887. His first act of office was to examine all pistols and rifles issued to police agents, and make sure that they were functional. In April 1887, he was a noted guest at Carol's banquet in Iași. He simultaneously served as leader of the National Liberal chapter, which led to accusation that he was abusing his power as Prefect, especially ahead of elections in January 1888. The "White" press had it that Boldur-Lățescu had embezzled public funds, extorted peasants, and taken bribes, as well as avoiding taxes or prosecution by having his revenues invested in a farm in Northern Dobruja. Lățescu was criticized when, on 1 April 1888, he vetoed Cassian Lecca's proposal to grant Junimea poet Mihai Eminescu a public pension. Aware that Eminescu was having a hard time making ends meet, he proposed granting him a one-time payment from the county council.

Portrait of Olga Boldur-Lățescu, published during her trial (March 1896)

Other voices praised Lățescu's philanthropy after he donated 151 bound volumes in French, previously in his own collection, to A. T. Laurian National College. Carol also recognized his contributions: in January 1888, he made Lățescu an Officer of the Order of the Crown. He resigned as prefect during the first week of April 1888, shortly after peasant revolts and the arrival in power of a Conservative Party-and-Junimea cabinet under Theodor Rosetti. Days after, he wrote Carol an open letter to complain about alleged administrative abuses. He contended that the new and "reactionary" Botoșani Prefect, Gheorghe Hermeziu, was oppressing the locals with the full support of Jews ("sworn enemies of the liberal party"), "proletarian" Romanians, and Gypsies. The letter ended with words of praise for Carol, congratulating him for his role in obtaining national self-determination and his styling as King. During January 1890, Boldur-Lățescu presented himself as a candidate in elections for Botoșani's city council. Later that year, he was called upon as a lawyer in Dorohoi. He first represented a local merchant, Prodan, in his dispute with the police agent Iacoban; he then switched to defending Iacoban, and to dismissing his own plea in favor of Prodan.

In November 1890, at Botoșani, Boldur-Lățescu inaugurated another political newspaper, Țara de Sus ("The Upper Land"); it advertised itself as committed to both the National Liberal platform (which was seen as having "created Modern Romania") and the "special interests of Moldavia". The new decade soon witnessed a rearrangement of the political landscape: Catargiu governed the country at the helm of a Conservative Party, which lost Junimist backing; Maiorescu and his men shifted instead toward a pragmatic alliance with the National Liberals. Boldur-Lățescu was still politically active during the April 1891 legislative election, but earned derision for his proposal of an alliance with Catargiu against Junimea. He ran for the 1st-College seat in the Assembly, but only took 27 votes and had to face a ballotage. In May, he was stripped of his party membership, alongside fellow dissenters Lecca and Panait Gheorghiade; all three joined the Conservatives. Țara de Sus, which had its editorial offices in Botoșani (though it was printed in Iași), was now identified by Junimea as a platform for George D. Vernescu's inner-Conservative faction. This final flurry of activity ended when Lățescu died suddenly in early June, at Iași's Victoria Hotel, after a sudden and unspecified illness. He was buried on 8 June at Cetățuia Monastery in Galata.

== Legacy and posthumous scandals ==
A Lățescu Street, honoring the former separatist, existed at Iași in 1937, when a municipal commission made controversial pushes to change its name. Teodor was survived by daughters Esmeralda (or Smaranda; married Ceaur-Aslan), Eugenia (Brăilescu), and Olga. In early 1893, the three of them had successfully sued the Ministry of Agriculture over a deposit their father had made for a land purchase in Oșlobeni. Aged 25 in 1896, Olga had been married off to a cousin, George Lățescu. Olga left him in March 1896, opting to live as a courtesan in Bucharest, though she was also reportedly married to an architect, Nicolae Gabrielescu. She then met Ioan Șabechi, a confidence man, together with whom she blackmailed, or simply robbed, Gabrielescu. This affair, "reported on by all contemporary newspapers", resulted in Olga's arrest. A defense team, comprising N. Ceaur-Aslan, Alexandru Djuvara, and Barbu Ștefănescu Delavrancea, obtained that she be seen as a person of diminished competence, or "great hysteric"; she was finally sentenced to one year in prison. The Boldur–Gabrielescu affair was retold in a romanticized reportage by Ion Luca Caragiale, who depicted the architect victim as a "gullible bohemian".

Of the three sisters, Esmeralda is known to have died in May 1928, at the age of 64. The Boldur-Lățescu branch of the Costachis was continued by Gheorghe Boldur-Lățescu's daughters, who lived a comfortable existence after being awarded property in the trial over Elena Bașotă's estate; and by, among others, Teodor's grandnephew, Romanian Army Major Ion Boldur (1899–1985), distinguished for his participation in both world wars. Ion's own son, Gheorghe Boldur-Lățescu (1929–2024), a political prisoner in Communist Romania and a historiographer thereof, was the family's last male descendant. His sister, Ana Boldur, was a writer and prolific translator. She married communist writer Mihnea Gheorghiu, and (as literary critic Alexandru George writes) thus "rescued whatever was left of the family".
