= Constantin Sion =

Moldavian political conspirator, genealogist, and polemicist (1795–1862)

Constantin (Cothi) Sion
- Gheorghe Ghibănescu's edition of Arhondologia
- Born: September 18, 1795; Iași, Moldavia
- Died: February 27, 1862 (aged 66); Iași, United Principalities
- Occupations: Civil servant, genealogist, propagandist, landowner, winemaker
- Writing career
- Period: ca. 1826–1862
- Genres: Chronicle, libel, literary forgery

Constantin Sion, also known as Costandin or Cothi Sion (September 18, 1795 – February 27, 1862), was a Moldavian political conspirator, genealogist, and polemicist. He was born into the lower ranks of the boyar aristocracy, and, though his brothers were able to climb the social ladder, he mostly had petty offices in the provinces. Sion's frustration with this standing, and his resentment toward more successful Greeks, shaped his literary work and his activities as a falsifier of documents, in conjunction with his younger brother Costache. Early on, he fabricated evidence that suggested his family was descended from the Khan Girays of the Crimean Khanate. Constantin experienced an episodic rise in status during the Greek War of Independence, when he supported the Ottoman Empire and had his loyalism rewarded with the title of Paharnic; however, he quickly reverted to the position of a minor copyist for the Moldavian Treasury, in which capacity he began gathering notes for his genealogical manuscript, Arhondologia Moldovei ("Moldavia's Peerage"). The latter, completed only in the 1850s and never published in its author's lifetime, combines historical record with political polemic, making its reliability a subject of dispute among later, professional historians.

The Sions were drawn into passive resistance toward the Russian Empire after the Russian invasion of 1828, and generally resented the constitutional arrangement known as Regulamentul Organic—though Constantin still served for a while in Focșani, including as mayor and guildmaster (Staroste). The family was especially resented, and eventually blacklisted, by the Russian-appointed Prince, Mihail Sturdza, whose rule is castigated throughout Arhondologia. In that context, Constantin and Costache Sion, alongside the scholar Gheorghe Săulescu, began circulating forged documents which passed for official writs, and which managed to persuade the public that they descended from the ancient boyardom. Though sharing some of the goals of the Moldavian 1848 revolutionaries, the brothers kept out of the events, and reverted to deep conservatism, criticizing both Sturdza and his opponents. They maintained this stance under the 1850s reign of Grigore Alexandru Ghica, resenting in particular his overtures toward Romanian nationalism, which included proposals for union with Wallachia. Constantin reluctantly followed his brother in supporting Grigore Sturdza as a candidate for the Moldavian throne.

The Sion brothers are widely credited as authors, or co-authors alongside Săulescu, of a supposed ancient narrative document, the Chronicle of Huru (1856). It fascinated scholars of that age, beginning with those who, like Gheorghe Asachi, also resented the unionist project. The Sion forgery was convenient to them for offering an account of life in the largely undocumented Romanian Dark Ages, and also for suggesting that Moldavian boyardom had its origins planted in the Roman Empire; in addition the work offered justification for the restoration of Greater Moldavia and its separation from Wallachia. The Chronicle was immediately suspicious—a commission appointed by Prince Ghica was called in to investigate, but, with both Asachi and Săulescu as members, failed to produce a verdict. Constantin Sion survived the formation of the United Principalities, which he had opposed, and died before the Huru controversy had been resolved in his disfavor. Frustrated in his efforts to inherit more of his father's estates, he spent some of his final years trying to establish his own village, "Sionești", on the northern outskirts of Pungești.

== Biography ==
=== Early life ===
Though some reference work suggest that Sion was born in 1796, he himself gave the date as September 7 (New Style: September 18), 1795—also listing himself as a native of Iași, the Moldavian princely capital. He was the third of six sons of the court official (Bașceauș) Iordache Sion and his wife Catrina, née Danu. His elders were Antohi and Ioniță Sion; Costache, Neculai and Toader were younger. Although brothers, Constantin and Costache had only slightly different forms of the same Christian name. To Costache and the other Sions, Constantin was known as "Cothi", a once-common pet name of Greek origin. Despite such familiarity with Greek customs, and his presence at the princely court, Iordache was the descendant of yeomen (răzeși). This is highlighted by literary historian Șerban Cioculescu, who notes that "three genealogical trees" independently confirm the Sions' peasant roots in Tutova County. Their name, he notes, is taken from a 17th-century Sion Coșăscu, linked to the village of Coșești.

The same author notes that a 1558 document, first published in 1951, may prove the clan's descent from Stephen the Great's second-Paharnic, Cristea, and as such their "authentic antiquity". This is also argued by historian Lucian-Valeriu Lefter: "the Sion brothers [...] do indeed have ancestors from the times of Stephen the Great [but], back in their day, they could not justify this in fullness, lacking the papers to prove it." Through Catrina Sion and her mother Maria, the Sion brothers were descendants of the Tăutu boyars. This family may have originated in Angevin Hungary, and were commonly thought of as West Slavs (or more precisely Slovaks); likely ancestors include Ioan Tăutu, who served as Stephen's Logothete. Dissatisfied with his seemingly modest origin, and unaware of any records that would prove a more ancient lineage, Constantin invented a prestigious pedigree, whereby they descended from the Khan Girays of the Crimean Khanate. "This bewildering story" created a 15th-century Tatar patriarch, Demir Khan, who had joined Stephen's Moldavian military forces and undergone conversion to Orthodox Christianity. The Sions also argued that their matriarch, and Demir's daughter-in-law, was Dumitra, daughter of a real-life courtier, Petre Clănău. In his other accounts, the chronicler makes false claims about his paternal grandfather—from initiating a (completely fictional) revolt in 1742 to having led 84 men into defeating a 2,000-strong branch of the Budjak Horde in 1757—, as well as spuriously suggesting that Iordache had been a war hostage.

Constantin was born at a time when Moldavia and Wallachia, as Romanian-inhabited vassals of the Ottoman Empire, were entering the final stages of rule by Greek elites, the Phanariotes. The wife of a reigning Phanariote, Michael Drakos Soutzos, had grown fond of Ioniță Sion, and obtained that he made a Paharnic. This ascendancy was replicated by Antohi under another Phanariote, Scarlat Callimachi, who made him Spatharios and legislator, while also encouraging his literary efforts. His appointments coincided with the Russo-Turkish War of 1806–1812, part of which was carried on Moldavian soil, and which resulted in the Russian annexation of Bessarabia (the eastern half of Moldavia). Antohi described this as an intolerable violation of Moldavia's territory, as he explained in a memorandum he addressed to the Congress of Vienna. Constantin's early years were spent at Iași; in one fragment of Arhondologia, he himself notes that he grew up in the same mahala (quarter) as his future persecutor Mihail Sturdza.

Sion was educated at Iași, where he became rather fluent in Greek; by his own account, he was sent to do work for the Moldavian Treasury at the age of 12. His political ascendancy probably began before 1820, his father having died in 1812. In old age, Constantin still complained that the only inheritance left to him by his father was a riding horse. The Greek War of Independence, which began on Moldavian soil, found him in a risky position. He acted as a messenger for Serasker Yusuf Pasha deep in occupied territory. As such, he narrowly escaped being lynched by the Sacred Band, which caught up with him outside Lunca Banului in April 1821. The episode saw him emerging as a loyalist of the Ottomans, and overall a Turkophile; in its aftermath, the Ottoman military made him a supervisor of the Ispravnici (civilian administrators). As leader of the pacifying force, Kethüda Kara Ahmed also assigned his brothers to similar positions: Neculai was the Kethüda's boyar aide (Meimandar), while Antohi served as quartermaster (Cămăraș) in Târgu Ocna.

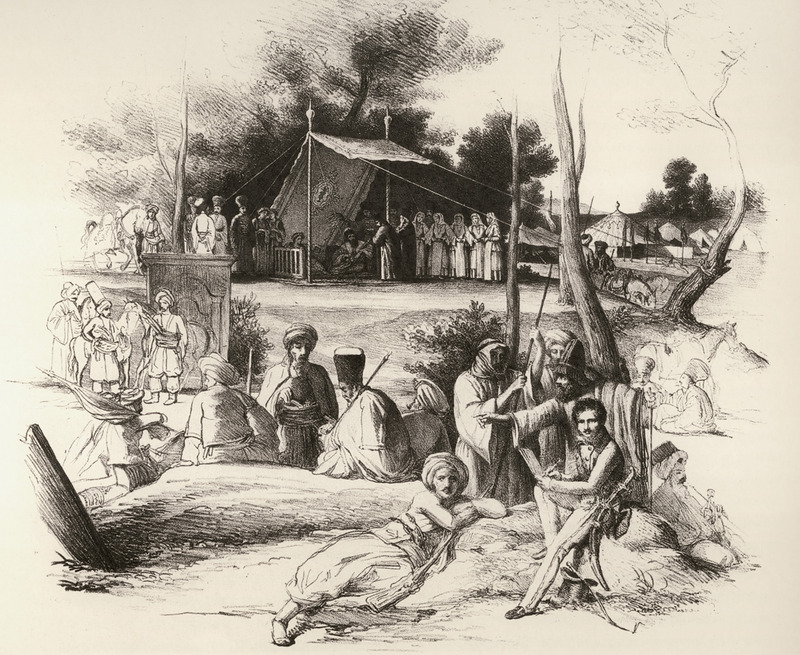
Michael Soutzos' itinerant court. 1827 lithograph by Louis Dupré

Constantin was recognized as Paharnic following the Ottomans' intercession on his behalf. However, his status abruptly declined with months, and the post-Phanariote age began with him as a copyist in service to the Moldavian Treasury. He was seconded there by his in-law, Vasile Mihalache Alecsandri, son of the famous poet Vasile Alecsandri and an in-law of his. His Arhondologia candidly records the Alecsandris' controversial origin, describing their patriarch, known to him as "Mihalachi Botezatu", as a Jewish bureaucrat. Also in 1822, Sion began his work as a biographer and historian, seeing out elderly boyar and using their testimonies as sources; "around 1826", he was also consulting documents including the treasury register for 1793 and what he called "historical manuscripts".

=== Political decline and related polemics ===
The Russian invasion of 1828 again changed Sion's fortunes: in 1829, he was dispatched as an envoy of the Moldavian boyardom at Brăila, Wallachia, where the Imperial Russian Army had been stationed. As Sion himself notes, that same year Peter Zheltukhin, as Russia's military overseer, "forcefully" assigned him to serve as mayor and guildmaster (Staroste) of Focșani. He then became a deputy (Vechil) of the Staroste for the entire Putna County; he married there, to Eufrosina, daughter of Ban Toma Stamatin and sister of Spatharios Gavril. He would later claim, spuriously, that she was a descendant of the Movilești dynasty. She brought in as her dowry an entrepôt in Focșani, as well as a winery in neighboring Odobești; the couple had seven children, of whom only three survived past their infancy: Nicolae (born 1831), Vasilică (1834), and Catinca (1840).

This period of his life coincided with the princely mandate of Ioan Sturdza, marking the end of Phanariote rules. The Sions' Turkophila pushed them into the opposition to this new regime: in 1823, Costache, identified as a conspirator against Sturdza, was captured by mounted police and pus în heră ("restrained with iron chains"). Constantin himself greatly resented the new prince for organizing a system whereby boyar titles could be purchased. However, as Staroste, he took a bribe to facilitate the ennobling of a priest's son, Iordachi Popa, who was promoted a Paharnic. He also confessed that he applied punishments with great severity and complained that the inflation of boyar titles increased the fiscal load on non-boyars. He himself directly contributed to the latter phenomenon, by accepting money to declare, falsely, than one of his taxpayers had died of the plague.

Russia's full participation in Moldavian affairs was recognized under the 1829 Treaty of Adrianople, giving way to a constitutional arrangement known as Regulamentul Organic. Antohi experienced a sudden rise in status, as Aga and Colonel in the revived Moldavian cavalry (1830–1835). Regulamentul's limitation of boyar privilege angered Antohi: in 1832, he was singled out by the Russians for having authored "revolutionary proclamations", which were in fact statements of his arch-conservatism. He was briefly detained in Bucharest, Wallachia by General Pavel Kiselyov, who then apologized to him for the inconvenience and offered him a Russian state decoration; he also served the regime, as an Ispravic at Bacău. Constantin was himself arrested, by error, and also taken to Bucharest—this gave him a chance to investigate first-hand the genealogical links between Moldavian and Wallachian boyars. Constantin's career as a forger began in 1832, when he helped Antohi create a genealogical record which could entitle Antohi's sons, Costachi and Alexandru, to study at a cadet school in Saint Petersburg (he would do the same for two other nephews in 1845).

The Regulamentul regime assigned titular princedom to Mihail Sturdza, who made sure that members of the Sion clan were no longer allowed to advance socially and politically. This caused Constantin dissatisfaction with political life, and inspired the most virulent parts of his written work, including his dwelling on Sturdza's penchant for political corruption; contrarily, in some of his autobiographical notes destined for more private use, he blames Costache's conflict with Sturdza for his own decade-long marginalization. Constantin's widowed mother only allowed her children access to Iordache's estate in 1834, when she retired to a convent. This included parts of Coșești and several plots of land along the Racova, over which the six children were left to quarrel and litigate. Constantin's younger brother Neculai established there a new village, Valea Cânepii, which was later absorbed into Ivănești. The family was by then in an open conflict with government. Costache was interrogated for his seditious projects in 1835, but confessed to nothing, mockingly inviting the Prince to "sew off my arm [and] wear my blood as a shirt". In 1839, Antohi participated in a boyar protest led by Leonte Radu, which had as its main goal of curbing Sturdza's recruitment of new boyars, but also advanced some progressive policies.

Antohi never sent his children to Russia, but instead used the forged writs to obtain local recognition for the Sions as ancient boyars; the courts awarded them that status, but only formally, since they continued to be sidelined politically. In the 1842 edition of Gazeta Transilvaniei, the brothers managed to print their spurious family tree, which drew some attention in intellectual circles. In 1845, twelve great boyars, including Costache Conachi, gave official recognition to one of the Sions' self-aggrandizing forgeries. The same document was accredited and published by scholar Gheorghe Săulescu, who thus embarked on a collaboration with the brothers. The same year, Săulescu published in Albina Românească another Sion forgery, which presented as a letter from Vasile Lupu to one Andreica Sion. Antohi himself copied by hand a version of the Ottoman–Moldavian Capitulations, and was described in some contexts as the author of that forgery; however, it appears that these were an early-18th-century hoax, more likely attributable to Nicolae Costin.

The Radu conspiracy also involved Costache, who nevertheless turned against the other participants. Cioculescu proposes that, overall, the Sions contributed little to the era of national awakening, with only one brother, Toader, playing a minor part in the abortive revolution of April 1848, before being pushed into exile. This was also the case with one of Constantin's many nephews, Ioniță's son Gheorghe Sion. In his own work of memoirs, Costache notes being in the attendance for the revolutionary meeting of April 1848, but simply reports his disdain: "I went there myself to gaze upon that treasonous assembly of the nobility." As Cioculescu notes, this was not necessarily because he opposed revolutionary goals (which he "did not know and did not care to know"), but certainly because the rebels had failed to demand Sturdza's abdication.

The mostly conservative Sions expected to climb politically once Russian influence began to wane in the 1850s. A passing note by historian Gheorghe Ghibănescu suggests that, in 1853, a "C. Sion" joined Ștefan Angheluță and Mihail Kogălniceanu in calling for "democracy and emancipation". Gheorghe Sion himself writes than, in the aftermath of the Crimean War, one of his uncles (whom he did not name) turned against Russia and demanded from the Sublime Porte that he be recognized as ruler of a revived Crimean Khanate. Constantin, who only had public office as the head of charities in Focșani (1840–1842), dedicated himself to writing, first with Arhondologia Moldovei, composed in stages from 1840 or 1844. By the time of the Crimean War, he was involved in another forgery, the Chronicle of Huru (also known as Izvodul lui Clănău); some note that the effort also involved Antohi and Costache, but this is questioned by Cioculescu. Instead, he attributes some contributions to the Logothete Gheorghe Boldur Costachi, who published it as a brochure in 1,000 copies, and to Săulescu, credited as the editor. Historian Andrei Pippidi contrarily believes that the Sions only provided some of the subject matter, and that Săulescu was the actual forger. He specifically questions whether Antohi and Iordache were ever witting participants in their brothers' hoaxes.

=== The anti-unionist ===
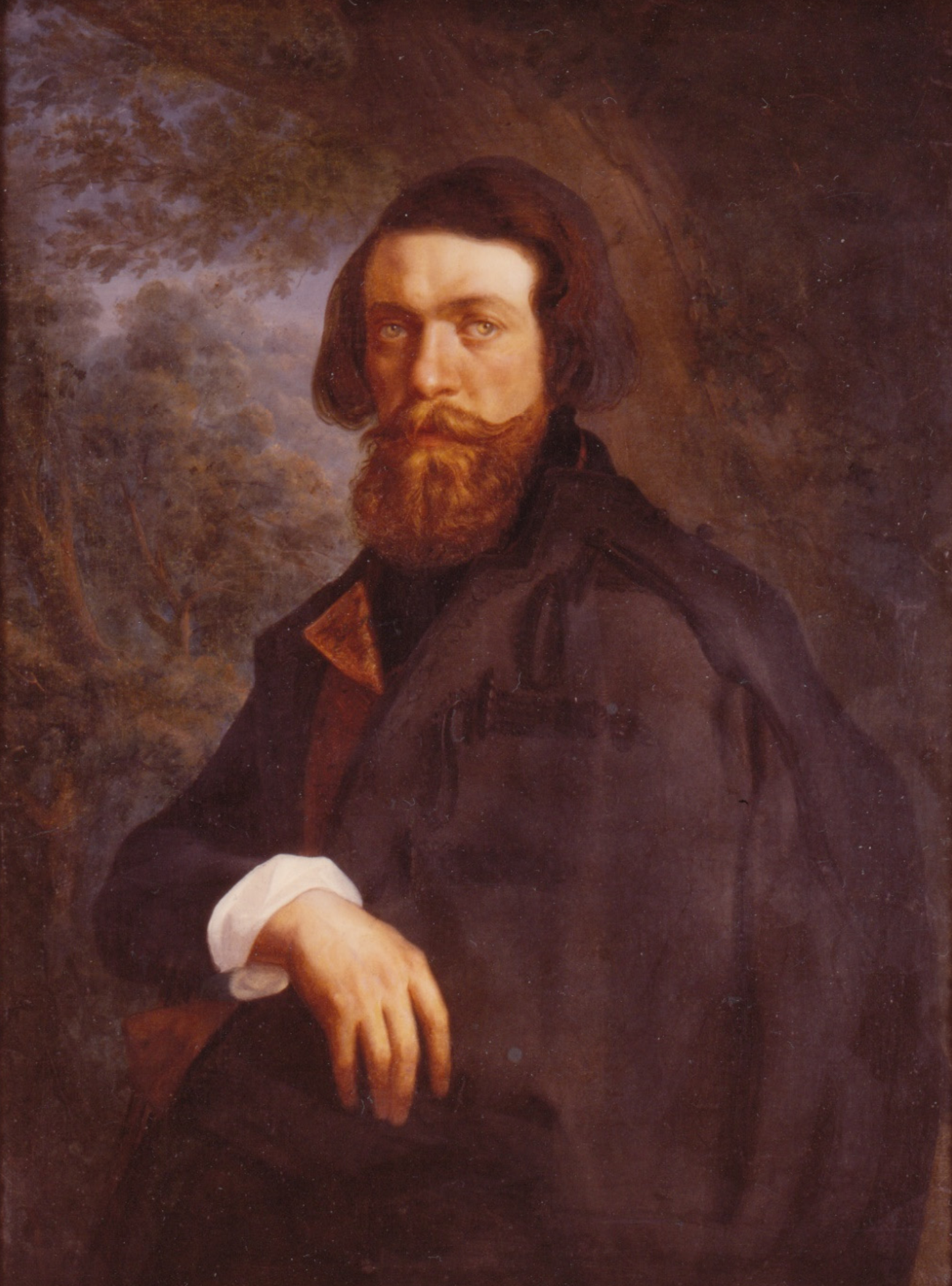
1850s portrait of Sion's political patron, Grigore Sturdza; attributed to Wilhelm von Kaulbach

The family could return to favor when a new Prince, Grigore Alexandru Ghica, took the throne. Antohi had since died in the cholera pandemic of 1848. A fragment of Arhondologia suggests that Constantin was incensed when his widow, advised by Toader Sion, married off Antohi's daughter to a Greek upstart, Fotachi Mavromate (in or around 1850). The Chronicle, meanwhile, was taken up and republished by the scholar Gheorghe Asachi, who was convinced of its authenticity, in 1856. According to historian Lucian Boia, theirs was a "document factory" involved in cementing the family's claim to greatness. The Chronicle also served to emphasize "Moldavian distinctiveness" and greatness, at a time when a Wallachian-centered form of Romanian nationalism was being embraced by the youth. Lastly, Boia notes, the Sions also intended to emphasize the legitimacy of Moldavian claims to Bessarabia (see Greater Moldavia).

Immediately after publication, on June 7, 1856, Ghica formed a scholarly commission to determine whether the Chronicle was in any way authentic. Săulescu was one of its members, but largely absented; the other figures were Asachi, Kogălniceanu, Damaschin Bojincă, Alecu Donici, August Treboniu Laurian, Costache Negruzzi, and Alexandru Papadopol-Calimah. As reported by Boia, Asachi split consensus by claiming that the Chronicle was genuinely historical; as Cioculescu notes, Asachi actually came to endorse the opinion that the text was a forgery, with only Săulescu maintaining that it was not. Kogălniceanu dedicated himself to the topic, publicizing his points by means of the magazine Stéoa Dunărei; the conclusion he provides here is reserved, noting that the work was probably inauthentic, but still "of great interest". As argued by Pippidi, this was a polite way of signalling his belief that Asachi had authored the text, which consequently had no historical value, but could still matter as a literary product. According to historian Vasile Maciu, his critical essay sampled his "critical spirit and scientific attitude." In his later recollections, Papadopol-Calimah noted that Kogălniceanu was supposed to draft the commission's report, but never did so.

The issue was by then politically charged, and entangled with the conflicting visions of Moldavia's future. Both Constantin and Costache Sion vehemently opposed the Moldo-Wallachian union, a process that was beginning just as the Chronicle saw print. Constantin saw unionism as a "fools' project", and backed Grigore Sturdza, son of Mihail, as the anti-unionist candidate in the princely election of 1858. The latter choice, which required him to electioneer for the younger Sturdza in areas "north of Focșani", was imposed on him by his brother Costache; secretly, Constantin despised Grigore as well as Mihail, and detailed his contempt for both in Arhondologia. By contrast, Costache had sided for a while with the National Party, before coming to reject unionism. He admired the younger Sturdza for his sanguine temperament, while dismissing Mihail as a "thief".

Constantin Sion was still writing on Arhondologia in or even after 1857—the text records Prince Ghica's suicide, which occurred in August of that year. His final years were spent in the newly unified country, which was to become the "Principality of Romania". Unlike Costache—who campaigned abroad "for 8 years and 17 days" against Romanian Domnitor Alexandru Ioan Cuza and openly bragged about this activity—, he appears not to have questioned Moldo-Wallachian unification beyond 1858. At the time, nephew Gheorghe, a liberal unionist, was embarking on his own literary career. In this context, he helped popularize his uncle's genealogical narrative, appropriating it in the first draft of his memoirs, published as a feuilleton in 1860; he also named one of his own sons "Demir".

The chronicler spent the final years of his life in "Sionești" or "Săonești", a village he was trying to establish (or, by his own account, reestablish) on land between Pungești and Fundul Racovii, some of which he had purchased from Ioniță Sion. The text records his bitterness at having been financially ruined by the long disputes with his brothers, and unable to provide a dowry for Catinca (he demands that her two brothers fill in the sum from their own pockets). As noted by Costache, Constantin died in Vanghele's Inn of Iași—at 2 AM on February 15, 1862 (New Style: February 27), after spending a week in bed with "stomach trouble". The final part of his last will was completed and signed at Vanghele's on February 12, when Sion still hoped for a recovery. Constantin's second son, Vasilică, who had served as a cornet in Moldavia's cavalry, received his father's documents and collection of books; he was by then also the inn's owner. Constantin's brother, who mourned him as a "true Moldavian, good patriot and good as a parent", notes that he was buried at the church of Fundul Racovii after a "very pleasant funeral ceremony".

== Literary work ==
=== Arhondologia Moldovei ===
Sion was seemingly unaware of literary works by his contemporaries—viewing Kogălniceanu, Negruzzi, Vasile Alecsandri, Alexandru Hrisoverghi and Costache Negri only as exponents of their families, and most often attacking them in libelous fashion. His writings only record his admiration for early authors, especially Alecu Beldiman and Costache Conachi; he also seems unaware of older texts by Moldavian chroniclers, even those whom his father had once copied by hand. His sampling of the previous Phanariote century relies on oral history, and he is sometimes the first record to mention some episodes from the 1700s—Sion records, for instance, that the rural boyar Mihai Racoviță was named Prince of Moldavia at a time when his wife Ana was busy scutching hemp; this helps date the event to September 1703 (though he himself provides a more confusing chronology).

As noted by Pippidi, Arhondologia and Costache's parallel memoirs are "extremely picturesque" works, while their use of the Moldavian dialect, particularly in their known forgeries, is riddled with recognizable "linguistic oddities". Nominally, Arhondologia is the second-ever genealogy to be completed by a Romanian, after Wallachia's Genealogia Cantacuzinilor. In noting this, Pippidi highlights that neither is a scientific work suited for the stated purpose, with Arhondologia being in fact a "virulent libel". Historian Neagu Djuvara also qualifies Sion's text as "something more of a libel than a boyars' dictionary, [...] riddled in mistakes and in mean statements that are hard to verify." However, he also cautions that the work is more precise and direct in documenting Alecsandri's Jewish origin than are later works, which took efforts to conceal it. Among the earlier Sion exegetes, Gheorghe Bogdan-Duică had proposed that "[Sion] is the only Romanian ever to have argued that Alecsandri has Hebrew origins." Similarly, Sion is known to have provided "partly true" information about the Angheluță boyars. He describes them as descending from "a publican in my father's pay", who owed his status to having once discovered a buried treasure.

Arhondologia stands out for its anti-Hellenic and overall xenophobic content—as noted by Cioculescu, Sion's text "overflows with stereotypical epithets" for Greek boyars, including putoare ("stench") or napastă ("bane"), and was entirely indifferent to positive contributions by Phanariotes such as Nicolae Șuțu. The Sacred Band of 1821 is described as cruel and sexually promiscuous—though he also derides some of the Band's boyar victims. However, the author abstains from his usual epithets when describing the family histories of the most powerful Greek boyar clans, beginning with the Rosetti family. "A contemporary of the liberal bourgeois ascendancy at a continental level", Sion "never joined the spirit of the times, even as it entered the ranks of his own family." His text is protective of the old class system, not just against penetration by the "churls", but also against modernization—including attacks on Prince Ghica, Anastasie Fătu, and their maternity hospital, which Simion calls a "whore-house, the house of illegitimate births".

Bogdan-Duică points out that "Grigore Ghica is one of C. Sion's most passionate objects of hatred. [...] Sion has some political reasons behind his hatred: Prince Grigore Ghica had toppled—as much as he could topple—old Moldavia, to bring about a new one, one that was ripe for the union [with Wallachia]; moreover: Prince Grigore Ghica had filled up higher offices with too many Greeks, something for which he was also criticized by V. Alecsandri." Ghica and his ministers are almost as reviled in the book as Mihail and Grigore Sturdza—though Sion notes that the former group, including Ghica, were morally superior to the Sturdzas. One portion of the chronicle takes relish in Ghica's suicide, defining him as a "cursed" figure. Other parts are the work attack Ghica's courtier, Costache Rolla, in terms which Bogdan-Duică note are wholly incompatible with Rolla's character, and which have to do with the unionist–separatist debate. While he derides Ghica and Rolla's brand of unionism, Sion admonishes the separatist leader, Nicolae Vogoride, for being a foreigner who could not credibly pass for a Moldavian patriot.

Another characteristic of Arhondologia is its self-serving nature—noted by Cioculescu as a mixture of "grandiose delusions" and sub-clinical "paranoia". He also notes that, overall, Sion's literary style is "informal, direct, uncontrolled, with a limited array of curses and insults, but in a regional, archaic, sometimes picturesque language." He records his enjoyment of Sion's musings on such topics as progress (with Moldavia as the land where "things are only ever begun", but never carried through) or the selection of surnames ("the churls will steal each and every nickname of the old nobility, so as to pass for nobles"). Cioculescu sees in Sion a "male frump", one who essentially missed out on the opportunity of being the Moldavian Saint-Simon. Like Asmodeus as portrayed in The Devil upon Two Sticks, "he commands for the roofs of houses to be lifted, and peeks inside to see all sorts of infamies", acting as the moral vigilante "when he can afford to".

Also according to Cioculescu, the "doubtfully famous" writing was also despised for very personal reasons—an "easily annoyed" Nicolae Iorga "avoided it in horror, since it publicized false information on his own origin and the moral profiles of his direct ancestors." Scholar Ștefan S. Gorovei notes that this "fierceness toward the Paharnic", with its "well-known subjective reasons", prevented Iorga from even noticing that Sion had correctly researched the origins of the Callimachi family. Sion's polemical stances were more calmly approached by industrialist Nicolae Malaxa, who read the work in order to discover "how his family had been scolded". In one portion of Arhondologia, Sion speculates that the Ottomanist boyar Ștefan Scarlat Dăscălescu was a passive homosexual, kept by his Turkish lover. As argued by Cioculescu, this spurious accusation is almost entirely based on a conflict between Dăscălescu and the chronicler's Stamatin in-laws, but also on Dăscălescu's stated Turkophilia; Sion proffered the claim "without realizing that, in the end, the suspicion is reversible, with other Turkophiles, including himself and Costache, being equally suspect on such grounds."

=== As "Huru" ===
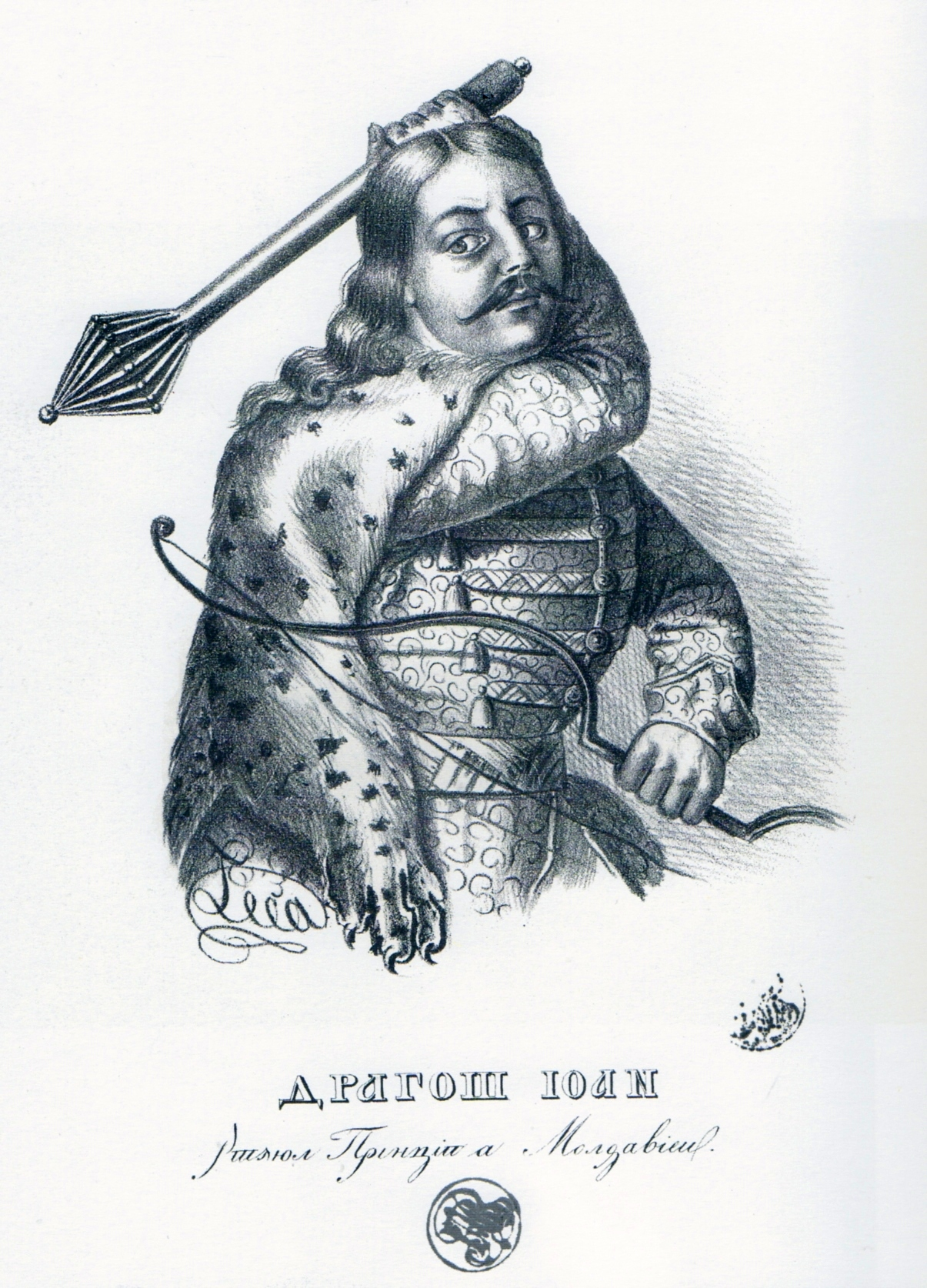
Dragoș of Moldavia in a 19th-century print by the Wallachian Constantin Lecca

The Chronicle of Huru is described by historian Andrei Pippidi as of the "'patriotic' forgeries of the 19th century [which aim] to fill a gap in documentary evidence, with the deliberate purpose of increasing a young nation's symbolic capital"; the relevant parallels he cites are the hoaxes pulled by Václav Hanka, Vasil Poletika, and Teodor Narbutt, in their respective contexts. Sion's forgery presents as a found manuscript from the 15th-century court of Stephen the Great, itself a synthesis of older texts detailing the Romanian ethnogenesis between Roman Dacia and the foundation of Moldavia. The Cyrillic text indirectly aims to settle disputes about the history of the Romanian language, by claiming to attest its existence in written form during the Early Middle Ages, or at least its usage by Stephen's boyars. As noted by Pippidi, it "was neither a Latin nor a Slavonic text, as one would have expected, but one written in monstrous Romanian, whose lack of analogies with any text known to philologists was justified in that the oldest-ever page written in Romanian can only be dated to 1521." The original parchment (anachronistically described as "Turkish paper" by some who claimed to have seen it) was reported by its publishers as lost by the Library of Iași. It was only ever available for examination in a calotype copy, preserved by Asachi, who also translated its content into readable modern Romanian.

The Chronicle's supposed merit in covering the "dark period" after Aurelian's retreat from Dacia in 274, down to the year 1274, was celebrated as such in the 1856 preface. Its central narrative depicts Moldavia as from origin a federated republic in direct succession to the Roman Empire. According to Pippidi, the republic's foundation has in itself an air of falsehood, with the "bizarre onomastics" of the boyars involved, the mixture of titles from different culture and periods, and the costumes described, which evoke French revolutionary dress under the Tribunat. He adds:

The brochure's readers, who likely shared that conservative prejudice which was soon to emerge as anti-unionist politics, were pleased to find out that Moldavia had not been discarded in the 3rd century [...]. The ancient inhabitants of Dacia, with their Biblical or Roman names and cognomina still found among boyars of the 16th–18th centuries, have created themselves an independent republic, its towns the same as those of later times [...].

Pippidi notes that, though short, the Chronicle is written with elements of a historical novel, and seems to borrow literary tropes from Asachi's novellas. "Huru" recounts the High Middle Ages with echoes from Dimitrie Cantemir, notably in describing the Second Bulgarian Empire as a Romanian polity and Dragoș of Moldavia as an Asenid. To these, he adds notes of xenophobia, as in describing the Byzantine Empire as a Greek state, and therefore "mean" toward Romanians. Dragoș's war of independence against Angevin Hungary is rendered as a heroic struggle, also involving, on the Hungarian side, Poland, the Holy Roman Empire, Tatars, and (anachronistically so) Cossacks. His title is rendered as "Consul" rather than Voivode, with his election and subsequent leadership of the Moldavian military forces taking place when he was an elderly man of 83.

== Legacy ==
The Chronicle was unusually popular, given its controversial nature. In addition to being fascinated by "Huru", Asachi incorporated several of the Sion forgeries, as genuine historical sources, in his own novellas—as with the 1855 Valea Albă, which credits the Demir account, and the 1855 Ziua din urmă a municipiului Iașenilor ("The Last Day of Iași Municipality"), which is simultaneously based on the Chronicle and on Edward Bulwer-Lytton's Last Days of Pompeii. His French-language translation of the original Chronicle was published in 1858, but failed to gain a readership outside Moldavia. As noted by Boia, in the later 1860s "Huru" inspired works of "national mysticism" by the Wallachian Ion Heliade Rădulescu, which dwelt on the notion of post-Roman Dacia as "autonomous and Christian". In the decades following publication, the forgery could still be seen as authentic by numerous Romanian intellectuals, including the likes of George Bariț, Dimitrie Bolintineanu, Nicolae Ionescu, Ioan Maiorescu, Aron Pumnul, V. A. Urechia, and Andrei Vizanti. The entry for "Romanians" in the 1868 Brockhaus Konversationslexikon, possibly authored by a young Titu Maiorescu, also referred to Huru as a real-life figure and a credited author, on par with Miron Costin and Ion Neculce. Definitive proof of the text's modernity was first brought up by Robert Rösler, who noted that it incorporates mistakes particular to 19th-century historiography, including a chronological error attributable to Abdolonyme Ubicini.

Partisans of the Huru narrative rekindled controversy in 1879, when they produced a second print of Asachi's version, published in Focșani. The person behind this editorial project may have been Teodor Boldur-Lățescu or Asachi's son Alexandru, both of whom intended to revive Moldavian separatism. The backlash against that attempt was led by professional historians and intellectuals grouped as Junimea, under Maiorescu's leadership. In his political articles, Junimist poet Mihai Eminescu expressed his bewilderment that Vizanti still endorsed the work, which appears, "even to basic philologists, at a first glance, as sheer galimatias and an unsophisticated forgery." In 1882, historical linguist Alexandru Philippide "still found it necessary" to write down the arguments against the Chronicle's authenticity, including a "minute analysis of grammar and vocabulary." Three years later, antiquarian Grigore Tocilescu validated earlier pronouncements by foreign researchers, describing the Chronicle as driven by either a "dubious pleasure of duping one's fellow men" or "blind and misdirected patriotism". He notes that details such as the original manuscript, as described by those who claimed to have seen it, being carefully dated, but stamped with a wrong seal, should have raised instant doubts about its authenticity.

Arhondologia was only made available for the public in 1892, when Gheorghe Ghibănescu produced a critical edition. Ghibănescu's preface contained some errors, including by suggestion that Sion had died "before the Union" (a guess stemming from Ghibănescu's observation that the book made no mention of the latter event). Its highly critical tone, Cioculescu notes, also "settled some scores" with Sion, since Arhondologia suggested, "from mere onomastic conjecture", that the Ghibănescus were fishmongers. In that same context, Ghibănescu publicized proof that Sion was the behind the Huru hoax, noting intertextuality between the Chronicle and Arhondologia, particularly when it came to Sion's genealogy as it appears in both; this moved focus away from Săulescu, who was still seen as the main culprit. This clue was picked up in 1894 by literary historian Aron Densușianu, who also noted that the Chronicle and Săulescu shared an "aberrant" grammar.

Some dissenting authors, beginning with Ionescu and Ioan Tanoviceanu, have continued to suggest that Constantin Sion's Chronicle was in fact based in part on a more authentic document from the 17th or 18th century. The issue was revisited in the 1930s by cryptologist Em. C. Grigoraș, who contended that the Chronicle's real author was Petre Clănău, whom the manuscript itself identifies as the copyist. Such accounts are dismissed by Pippidi as unrealistic; he notes instead that the author disguised his style to something resembling older records, and that Săulescu, possibly with the Sions' participation, was equipped for that task. In his view, the intertextual references to the Chronicle in Arhondologia could suggest that Constantin viewed the former as a genuine historical record. Since Arhondologia was meant for private readings, he "had no reason to deceive anyone". The Giray myth, once consigned to writing by Paharnic Constantin, remained a family favorite. The original Demir Sion died in 1884, aged 23, leaving a tract of political sociology to be published by G. Găvănescul. In 1877, another Gheorghe Sion, nephew of the poet, had opted to sign himself "G. Sion Gherai", precisely to avoid confusion with his uncle.

By the time of Arhondologia's publication, the elder Gheorghe had become more critical of his own uncle, with a palinode which seemed to Cioculescu to be "condescending and ironic". Other branches still maintained a residual belief in Constantin's forgeries—several of his great- and great-great-nephews were still baptized "Demir" into the 20th century; they include Romanian Land Forces Colonel Demir Sion (1875–1936) and his son, Captain Demir D. Sion. The Paharnic's direct descendants include a posthumous grandson, Doctor Vasile V. Sion (1869–1921)—noted for his opposition to Romania's participation in World War I, but later also for his organization of the Army's Sanitary Service, which sustained the war effort. He was a leftist by conviction, having joined the Social Democratic Party and supported the campaign for universal suffrage. His marriage to obstetrician Lucreția Moscuna (1870–1932) produced two children. By the 1920s, the Paharnic's posthumous lineage had been merged with that of a Wallachian literary family, the Caragiales. Mateiu Caragiale, himself and aspiring genealogist an heraldist, honored his wife's lineage by insisting on using the name of "Sion" for his family plot in Fundulea.
