= Kate E. Griswold =

American editor, publisher and proprietor

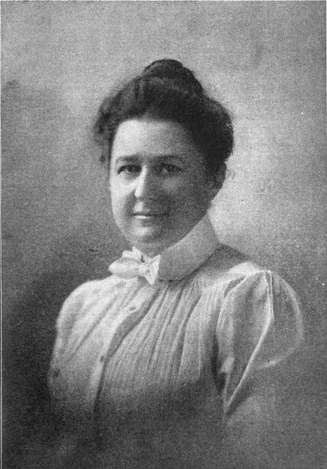
- Born: May 9, 1860; West Hartford, Connecticut, U.S.
- Died: October 6, 1923 (aged 63); West Hartford, CT
- Education: West Hartford High School
- Occupations: Editor, magazine publisher, proprietor
- Writing career
- Language: English
- Subject: Advertising
- Notable work: Profitable Advertising

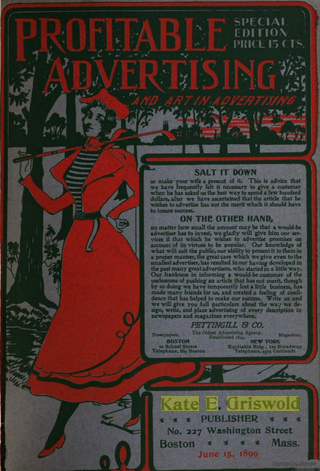
Profitable Advertising (June 1899)

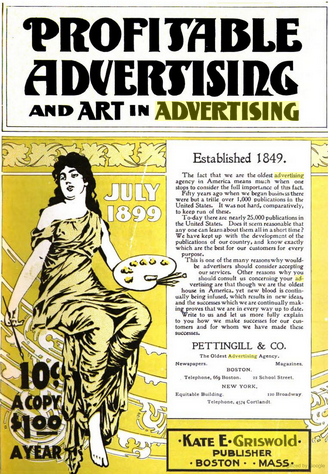
Profitable Advertising (July 1899)

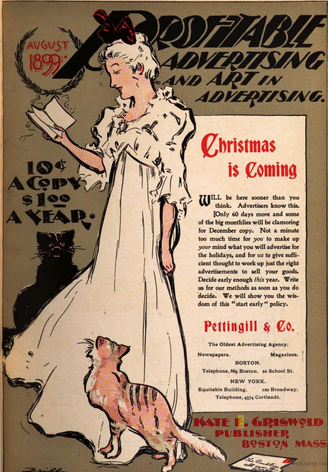
Profitable Advertising (August 1899)

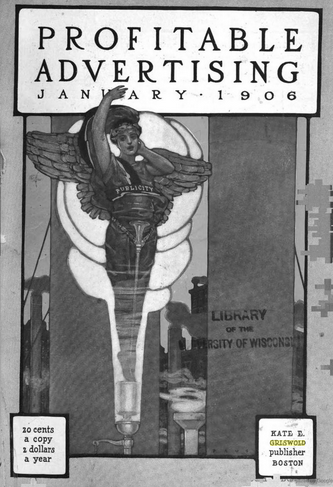
Profitable Advertising (January 1906)

Kate E. Griswold (May 9, 1860 – October 6, 1923) was an American editor, publisher, and proprietor of Profitable Advertising, a monthly trade journal for advertisers. She was "one of the most respected women in turn-of-the-century advertising".

Griswold made a distinct business success of this publication, which was one of the pioneers in advertising journalism. She also made it a standard authority on advertising and similar subjects. Her work was represented at the World's Fair in an exhibit displaying an array of the covers which appeared on Profitable Advertising for years back.

== Early life and education ==
Kate E. Grisworld was born in West Hartford, Connecticut, May 9, 1860. She passed her early girlhood there. Her ancestry could be traced back through various lines to conspicuous early colonists of her native State, she being also a "Mayflower" descendant, deriving through both father and mother from William Bradford, Governor of Plymouth Plantation. Her father, John Belden Griswold, was born in 1828, son of Josiah Wells and Mary Ann (Belden) Griswold. Her mother, whose maiden name was Cornelia Arnold Jones, was born at East Hartford in 1830, daughter of Joseph Pantra Jones and his wife, Sarah Comstock.

A brother three years older than Griswold, died in early childhood. He had been the joy of his father's heart, and Griswold came to take this brother's place. The love the father had bestowed on the boy and the pride he took in him were somehow inherited by the little daughter, fortunately for both the father and the child.. So soon as she was old enough, Griswold was this father's shadow wherever he went. She followed him to the fields, she sat uon the reaping machine and drove the horses. She milked the cows, and raised vegetables; she reared chickens and calves. Once, she helped shingle a barn.

She was educated in the high school of her birth, and took a finishing course at Woodside, a school for young women in Hartford, Connecticut.

Her first money was earned at poultry rearing and vegetable gardening, which she had made financially profitable. At one time, she had 200 to 300 chickens. Her knowledge of the chicken industry enabled her to write with practical intelligence on the subject. When very young, she wrote of chicken and eggs for The Poultry World and wrote so well that she was invited to take a desk at its office.

She was a lover of the outdoors and was known to indulge in pastimes such as golfing and fishing.

== Career ==
At the age of 16, she entered the office of The Poultry World, at Hartford, where she handled much of the correspondence pertaining to the advertising department of that paper. Later, she worked in the office of the National Trotting Association, where her close application resulted in nervous prostration, which compelled her to retire from the business world for some time.

When her health recovered, flattering offers were at Griswold's disposal, but she turned from them all to take up the management of the organ of a local charitable enterprise. To The Hartford City Mission Record, and to the cause in general which it represented, she devoted herself for the next four years. Toward the close of this period of charitable work, she entered into several prize competitions for advertising designs, carrying off the honors in a number of cases, including a competitive examination of 800 applicants, Grlawold winning because she wrote rapidly and showed herself to possess a high, degree of general business acumen. The attention which this attracted -a woman's success as an "ad" writer- led to an offer from Boston, as general ad writer and correspondent in the office of the C. F. David Advertising Agency.

Soon demonstrating her fitness as an editor, C. F. David Advertising Agency engaged her to edit Profitable Advertising. The agency could not make a success of the publication, and finally it was turned over to Griswold as a failure. She would not give up, however, and after dealing with difficulties, she made it a success, and all this in the face of the fact that there were several well-established journals of the same character in the field prior to the time she entered it.

== Advice ==
Griswold said:

“What methods have I used? Why, honest ones, I hope. I have tried to make a good publication and sell it upon its merits. That has been my formula of success. Difficulties? Well, I have known what it is to live on three dollars a week. It has not been all plain sailing. But there has always been plenty of encouragement to go on, and at present my journal is on an extremely satisfactory footing. No, I don't think that a woman has any advantage over a man in the publishing field—certainly she had many disadvantages ten years ago, for women had not begun to do so large a share of the world's work, and when she went into business there were many who looked askance at her efforts. Those days are past, happily, and now she is on an equal footing with men—is at liberty to go ahead unquestioned and do the best that lies in her. In the advertising field there are probably as good opportunities as in other departments of business. In fact, there are some notably successful women in advertising and publishing. Miss Keyes, of the Semi—ready Clothing Company, is one right here in New York, while in Chicago there is Mrs. Dr. Ellen Sage, who was formerly with the J. Walter Thompson agency, and who is now an independent ad writer. In publishing, there are Miss Caro M. Clarke and Miss Helen Winslow, of Boston. Miss Clarke has been very successful as a publisher of fiction, and was almost the first to use billboard advertising as a medium for exploiting novels. Women are successful as advertising solicitors, while in ad writing there are many lines that she can handle to better advantage than men provided she has equal ability. Her viewpoint gives her certain advantages, of course, but it is all a matter of ability. The day is gone when she can be classed by herself. The February issue of Profitable Advertising is to be a woman's number, dealing with her work in the field of publicity, and I think that it will be something of a revelation. As for the woman who wishes to embark in advertising — well, if she has ability, I believe it better for her to enter upon actual work as the associate of an advertising manager. Real experience transcends all theory. Such positions almost invariably give her experience of retail advertising, which seems to be the natural point of beginning in an advertising career. Retail advertising operations bring one into close touch with readers. You fire at short range and fire often, and the experience gained is invaluable in general publicity."

She continued:

"There are many phases in the advertising business—many and varied places which can be and are being filled advantageously by both men and women. But in this, as in other lines of business, results count. In order to bring the science of advertising to bear upon a certain line of business in such a manner as to turn the pockets of the reading public inside out, ability to speak or to write the "King's English" to perfection, sketch an attractive illustrative feature or arrange a pleasing type display are not as essential as might be supposed to the person occupying the place of advertisement writer, designer, agent or solicitor. All these things are important in their way. The chief essential is good, sound business sense, a knowledge of the business to be exploited and of the condition of the market, and such a fund of general information pertaining to the business world as can only be acquired through actual experience and close contact with it. Before one can reach the point where her services are really valuable, in a commercial sense, the student must climb many rounds of the ladder and pass through a variety of experiences."

== Death ==
Kate E. Griswold died October 6, 1923.
