= Quintessence of Ibsenism =

1891 essay by George Bernard Shaw

The Quintessence of Ibsenism is an essay written in 1891 by George Bernard Shaw, providing an extended analysis of the works of Norwegian playwright Henrik Ibsen and of Ibsen's critical reception in England. By extension, Shaw uses this "exposition of Ibsenism" to illustrate the imperfections of British society, notably employing to that end an imaginary "community of a thousand persons," divided into three categories: Philistines, Idealists, and the lone Realist.

The essay originated in response to a call for papers from the Fabian Society in the spring of 1890, "put forward under the general heading 'Socialism in Contemporary Literature.'" Shaw read the original paper, "the first form of this little book" at the St. James's Restaurant on 18 July 1890.

Shaw devotes the piece largely to a discussion of Ibsen's recurring topic of the strong character holding out against social hypocrisy, while acknowledging in his essay's final sentence that the quintessence of Ibsenism is that "there is no formula".

== Categorisations ==
The classification of an individual character into one of the three categories depends on his use or rejection of ideals, which Shaw views as masks which "hide the face of […] truth". Idealists, as their name indicates, rely exclusively on the use of masks; a realist insists on their removal. The Philistine, term for which Shaw is indebted to Matthew Arnold, neither constructs nor removes masks, content not to question reality.

According to Shaw, "[o]ut of a thousand persons […], there are 700 Philistines, 299 idealists, and only one lone realist".

=== The Philistine ===
Shaw, unlike Arnold who viewed Philistines as obstacles to human and cultural progress, constructs this type as relatively harmless though it includes the majority of society. Philistine characterization varies widely in Shaw's novels and plays, and becomes less and less frequent in his later works. The Philistine is often likeable, endowed with athletic ability, unpretending and credulous. Examples of this type exhibit a range of social backgrounds, Clod including the aristocracy and professions such as the army, the church, and politics. Johnny Tarleton in Misalliance is an ordinary, vaguely incompetent business man; Colonel Daniel Craven in The Philanderer is a well-meaning, gullible retired officer. In his serial drama In the Beginning, Shaw casts Adam himself as Philistine, perhaps allowing an explanation for the sheer numbers of the Philistine type today.

=== The Idealist ===
The idealist type is, rather than the Philistine, the focal point of Shaw's critique of British society. As active rather than passive, the idealist is to be considered dangerous due to his desire to uphold and defend values such as duty and altruism at the expense of individual life and happiness. He is characterized by a "devotion to romantic illusions" such as that of honor and self-sacrifice and the "plausible" excuses with which he seeks to justify the extremes of his conduct (which invariably consist of an "attack on the nonconformist". A trait common to all idealists is the tendency to enhance the aesthetic value of (and thus reinforce the power of) everything linked with the establishment and with the perpetuation of family life. The idealist confers an inordinate importance to love and sex. A prime example of the idealist is Marian Lind who elopes with an American inventor in The Irrational Knot.

=== The Realist ===
Although Shaw denied portraying either villains or heroes in his plays, he clearly pits the idealist against the realist in a manner which suggests the typological superiority of the latter. Often cynical, opinionated and characterized by independence (due to a diffuse mistrust of others), the realist is first and foremost a skeptic. In his book Men and Supermen, Shavian critic Arthur H. Nethercot divides the realist type further into Diabolonians (rebels who particularly enjoy shocking conventional and orthodox sensibilities), the Disillusioned (characters who undergo a series of disillusionments in order to become realists) and the Nature Worshipers (who acknowledge the power of Nature and its influence).

=== The Superman ===
A leader, the Superman is an inherently political figure. A very rare type, Shaw endows the Superman—which Shaw insists is not based on Nietszche's conceptual use of the term—with the exemplary qualities mankind must develop in order to forestall and reverse its destructive tendencies. Although what these specific qualities are remains somewhat elusive, Shaw playfully constructs the picture of "some sort of goodlooking philosopher-athlete". Clearly type-cast as a realist and practically as a new species, the Superman will, according to Shaw, "undoubtedly […] empty a good deal of respectable morality out like so much dirty water, and replace it by new and strange customs". Freedom from "common ideals", creativity, originality and a lucid understanding of human affairs emerge as defining characteristics.

The type of the Superman Nethercot also divides into three subcategories, that of Superman Past (of which Prometheus, according to Shaw, was the first specimen), which seems associated with failure, Superman Present, a non-historical character which does not correspond to any contemporary prototype, and Superman Future, which seems to point to an evolutionary development of man into Superman. Nethercot claims that "there are no real Supermen in any of Shaws' plays", with the possible exception of the Hermaphrodite of his Farfetched Fables.
