= Profitable Advertising =

Profitable Advertising was an American advertising magazine founded in Boston, Massachusetts, in June 1891. Its subtitle read: "A Monthly Journal Devoted Exclusively to Advertisers. We Show you how to do it." C. F. David was the publisher. The subscription price was $1.00 per year. The publication was undertaken with the intent to publish a journal in the interests of advertising and advertisers.

Profitable Advertising absorbed Charles Austin Bates' Current Advertising, together with Returns, of San Francisco, and opened a New York City office besides the Boston office on Nassau Street. Of more than 200 advertising publications that were launched at various times during the years 1888–1903, approximately 30 continued to publish and were listed in the American Newspaper Directory. Kate E. Griswold became the owner of Profitable Advertising in 1895. Founded as an organ for the C. F. David advertising agency in 1891, it ran indifferently for a year when Griswold took editorial charge. There was not much of a foundation for a successful periodical when the agency went out of existence in 1895, but Griswold put the publication upon an independent editorial and business basis, and maintained the journal on that basis thereafter, gradually evolving a successful monthly that was circulated upon its merits and filled a very tangible need in the advertising world. Where advertisers take two trade journals those two are pretty certain to be Profitable Advertising and George P. Rowell's Printers' Ink.

Griswold's Profitable Advertising and Selling Magazine published by Emerson P. Harris, were merged in June 1909 into one magazine as Advertising & Selling. George French, for many years editor of Profitable Advertising, continued as editor-in-chief with A. Eugene Bolles as general manager. Bolles had previously been with Housefurnishing Review. The main office of the new publication were at 253 Broadway, New York. The Harris-Dibble Company effected the consolidation.

== Gallery ==
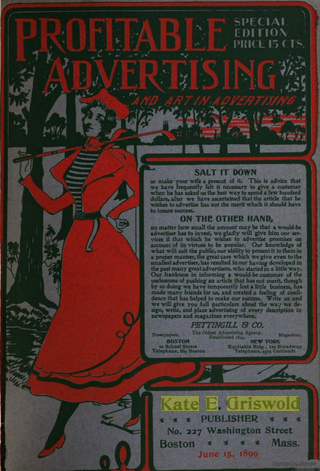
Profitable Advertising (June 1899)

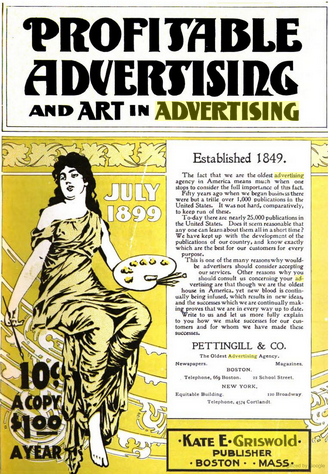
Profitable Advertising (July 1899)

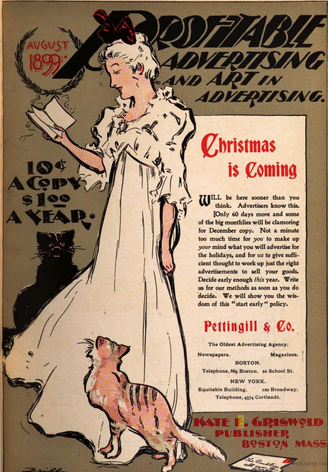
Profitable Advertising (August 1899)

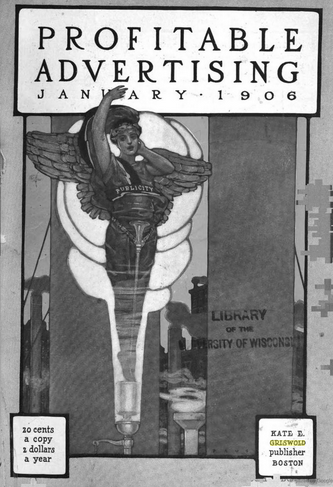
Profitable Advertising (January 1906)
