= Hedda Anderson =

Swedish writer, teacher, and school founder

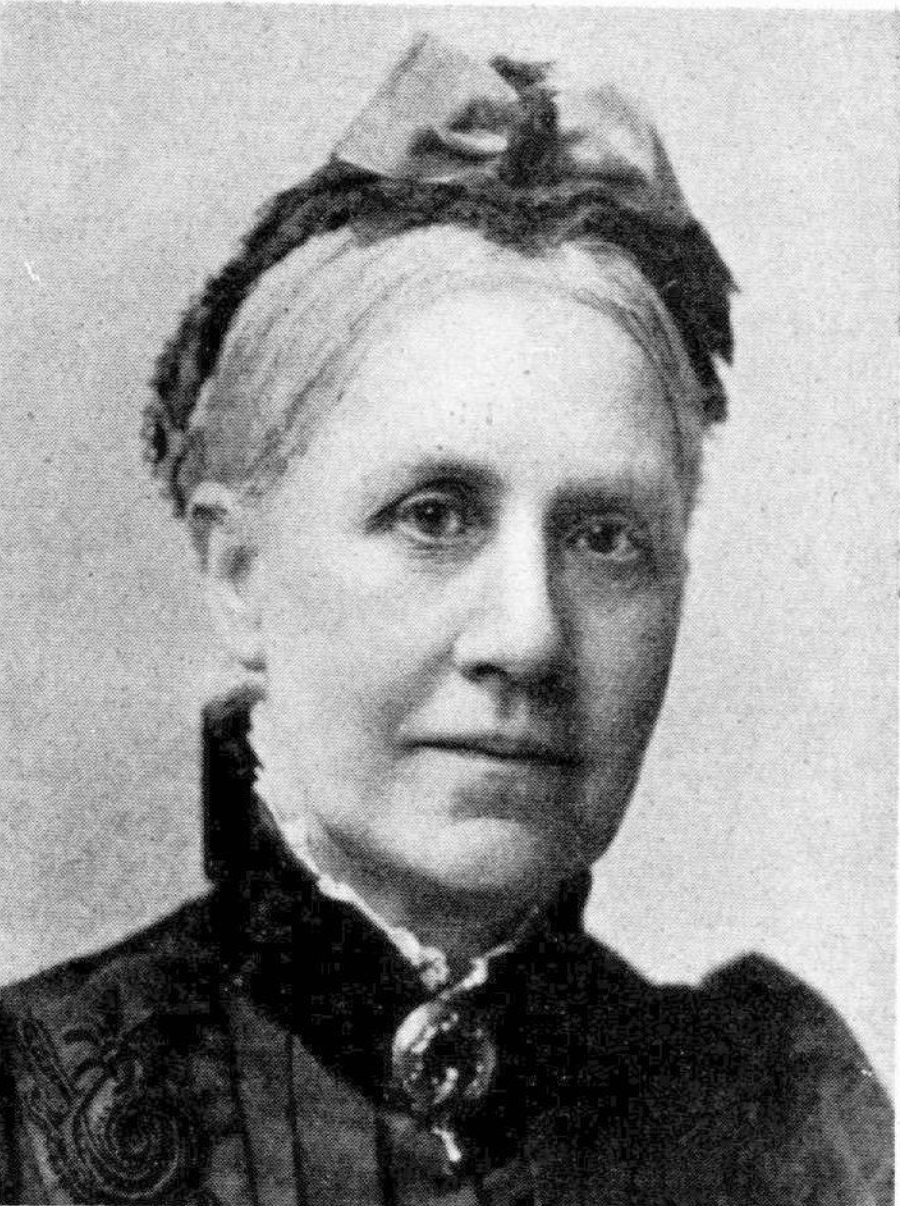
- Born: June 4, 1832; Botilsäter Parish, Sweden
- Died: April 2, 1912 (aged 79); Engelbrekt Parish, Stockholm County, Sweden
- Occupations: writer, teacher, school founder

Hedvig "Hedda" Elisabet Anderson (4 June 1832 – 2 April 1912) was a Swedish writer, teacher, and school founder. She wrote numerous books for children, and published collections of retold tales from different cultures. Her works were also used for instruction in schools.

== Life and career ==
Hedda Anderson was born on 4 June 1832 in Botilsäter, a parish in Värmland county. She was the daughter of mill manager Knut Freudenthal and his wife Anna Elisabet Erikson. After her family went bankrupt in 1834, they moved to Säffle. A few years later, Anderson was sent to live with her paternal uncle, who was the rector of Tösse. Self-taught and raised in pious circles, Anderson developed an early pedagogical interest which inspired her to become a teacher. At the age of 19, she started working as a private tutor to several families.

In 1867, Anderson moved to Kristinehamn where she taught the daughter of the foreman Johan Elis Anderson. They married in 1873. While in Kristinehamn, Anderson co-founded the Kristinehamn educational institution for girls and served as its board member. In the 1880s, Anderson contributed to the Swedish newspapers Arbetarens vän and Linnea.

Following her husband's death in 1888, Anderson moved to Stockholm and became an instructor at the Anna Sandström school, a private girls' school. At the age of 58, she began her literary career, during which she published a variety of work. Her works were primarily focused on the lives of people. P. A. Norstedt & Söner released Rolf's summer holidays, Anderson's first published children's book in 1891. Two more children's books, Rolf's new cousins and From Aunt Lotta's letter collection were published in 1892 and 1895. Several other books followed in the next few years, including Fairy Tale Evenings with Aunt Lotta – fairy tales arranged for group reading, City Girls in the Country, and Little Lisa and her foster brothers. She also served as the editor of the anthology of short stories, From the bookshelf – reading for home and school.

In the 1890s, Anderson published collections of retold folk tales from Greek and Nordic cultures, which were published in several editions across the country. She wrote books which were used for instruction in schools. Her textbook "Swedish language exercises" in 1895, was used for teaching Swedish in Finnish schools. She also translated the works of other writers, such as "The Godson of Death" by Leopold Budde, and "The Great Wide World" by Elisabeth Wetherall. In 1896, she was elected to the women's cultural association Nya Idun, and in 1899, she served as one of the founding members of the Private Higher Teachers' Seminary, Stockholm.

Anderson died in Stockholm, in 1912.
