= John Churton Collins =

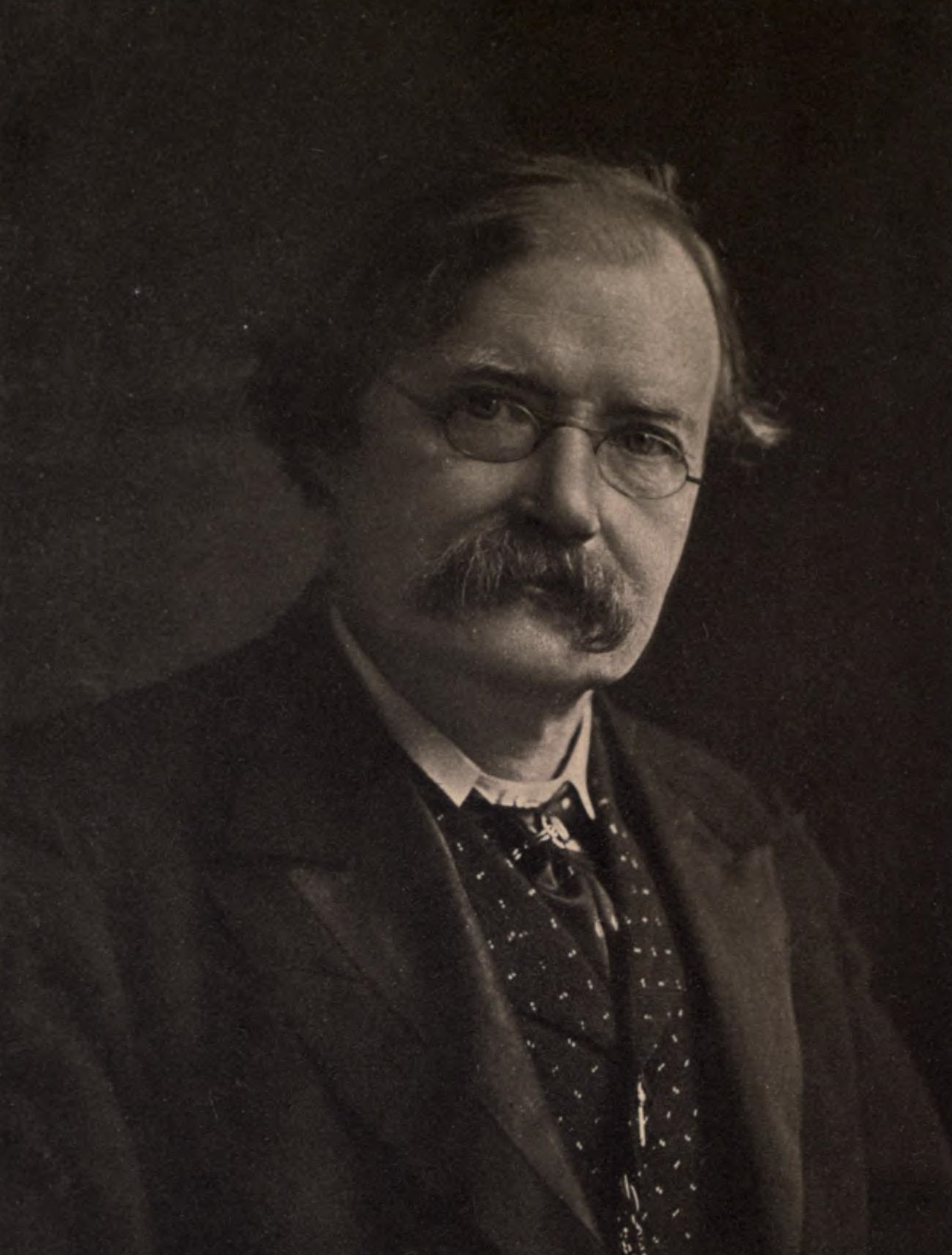
- Born: 26 March 1848; Bourton-on-the-Water, Gloucestershire, England
- Died: 15 September 1908 (aged 60); Lowestoft, Suffolk, England
- Education: Balliol College

John Churton Collins (26 March 1848 – 15 September 1908) was a British literary critic.

== Biography ==
Churton Collins was born at Bourton-on-the-Water, Gloucestershire, England. From King Edward's School, Birmingham, he went to Balliol College, Oxford, where he graduated in 1872, and at once devoted himself to a literary career, as journalist, essayist and lecturer. His first book was a study of Sir Joshua Reynolds (1874), and later he edited various classical English writers, and published volumes on Bolingbroke and Voltaire in England (1886), The Study of English Literature (1891), a study of Dean Swift (1893), Essays and Studies (1895), Ephemera Critica (1901), Essays in Poetry and Criticism (1905), and Rousseau and Voltaire (1908), his original essays being sharply controversial in tone, but full of knowledge.

In 1904 he became professor of English literature at Birmingham University. For many years he was a prominent University Extension lecturer, and a constant contributor to the principal reviews. On 15 September 1908 he was found dead in a ditch near Lowestoft, Suffolk, at which place he had been staying with a doctor for the benefit of his health. The circumstances necessitated the holding of an inquest, the verdict being that of accidental death.

== Criticism ==
Lord Tennyson, a target of Collins' pen, referred to him as "a louse in the locks of literature".

== Works ==
- Bolingbroke: A Historical Study (1886).
- Illustrations of Tennyson (1891).
- The Study of English Literature (1891).
- Essays and Studies (1895).
- A Treasury of Minor British Poetry (1896).
- The Early Poems of Alfred, Lord Tennyson (1900).
- Ephemera Critica (1901).
- Jonathan Swift, a Biographical and Critical Study (1902).
- Critical Essays and Literary Fragments (1903).
- Studies in Shakespeare (1904).
- Studies in Poetry and Criticism (1905).
- 13 essays, most on 18th century poets, in Poets' Country, ed. Andrew Lang (1907).
- Voltaire, Montesquieu and Rousseau in England (1908).
- Greek Influence on English Poetry (1910).
- Life and Memoirs of John Churton Collins (1911).
- The Posthumous Essays of John Churton Collins (1912).
