= Catonism =

Supports those in power and opposes reforms and development

Catonism refers to a repressive social order that supports those in power and opposes reforms and development, particularly those that would benefit the peasantry. It is based on the romantic political view that gives more weight to the organic and whole nature of peasant culture.

== Origin ==
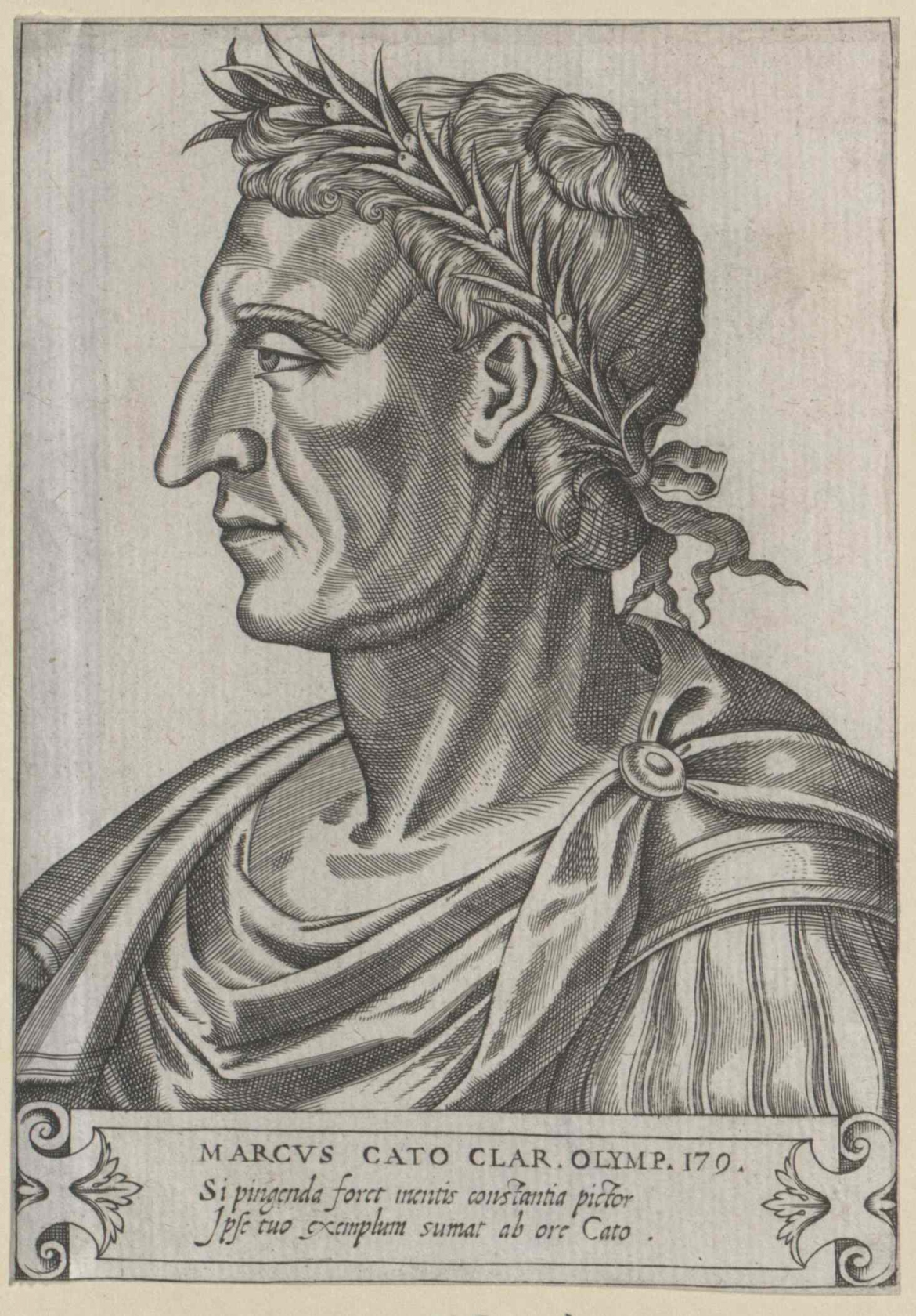
Catonism is inspired by Marcus Porcius Cato or Cato Major.

Barrington Moore introduced Catonism in his book Social Origins of Dictatorship and Democracy as the "advocacy of the sterner virtues, militarism, contempt for 'decadent' foreigners and anti-intellectualism".

Moore coined the word "Catonism" with a nod towards Cato the Elder (234-149 BCE). He characterized the Catonist attitude as the reaction from rural aristocracy towards rapid political and economic changes.

...The function of Catonism is too obvious to require more than brief comment. It justifies a repressive social order that buttresses the position of those in power. It denies the existence of actual changes that have hurt the peasants. It denies the need for further social changes, especially revolutionary ones. Perhaps Catonism may also relieve the conscience of those most responsible for the damage - after all, military expansion destroyed the Roman peasantry. Modern versions of Catonism arise too out of the adoption by the landed upper classes of repressive and exploitative methods in response to the increasing intrusion of market relationships into an agrarian economy...

== Beliefs ==
The social order has three core beliefs. The first is the notion that liberty is the highest good and that sacrifices made for its achievement is a worthy pursuit. The second is the belief that service to one's country constitutes an individual's most important calling. Finally, it holds that the proper outlook towards power must be anchored on vigilance since authority can be utilized to achieve a specific purpose or advance an interest. Moreover, policies are not supported to obtain happiness or wealth but to contribute to a way of life that proved valid in the past.

== See also ==
- Fascism
