= Chronicle of Huru =

The Chronicle of Huru (Romanian: Cronica lui Huru) was a forged narrative, first published in 1856–1857; it claimed to be an official chronicle of the medieval Moldavian court and to shed light on Romanian presence in Moldavia from Roman Dacia and up to the 13th century, thus offering an explanation of problematic issues relating to the origin of the Romanians and Romania in the Early Middle Ages. Publicized and endorsed by the Romantic nationalist intellectuals Gheorghe Asachi (who edited the published version) and Ion Heliade Rădulescu, it was argued to have been the work of Paharnic Constantin Sion (or another member of his family) or that of Gheorghe Săulescu, Asachi's friend and lifelong collaborator.

== Content ==
The document claimed to be the version of a text from the 13th century, relying on information first written down by a certain Arbore the Campodux (Campoduxul Arbore) and edited in Medieval Latin by Huru, depicted as chancellor for Moldavia's founder, Prince Dragoş (who, the text claimed, had ruled ca. 1270-1280); the final version was claimed to be a transcription of Huru's chronicle through the intervention of Spătar Clănău, a member of Stephen the Great's court (late 15th century). Bogdan Petriceicu Hasdeu, who believed it was "the oldest Moldavian chronicle", argued that Stephen the Great had discovered Huru's version in Lviv, at the time part of Jagiellon Poland, "while robbing the palace of a Galician magnate".

The chronicle began by stressing the continuity between Roman colonists in the region and the inhabitants of Moldavia: according to the text, in 274, when Emperor Aurelian ordered his troops to retreat from areas north of the Danube, colonists gathered in Iaşi and voted to stand their ground and resist migratory intrusions. Consequently, they decided to organize themselves as a federal republic extending from the Carpathians in the west to the Dniester in the east.

== Impact and character ==
The Chronicle of Huru was published during the last period of Moldavian statehood, three years before the country's union with Wallachia, in the wake of the Crimean War, at a time when the two Danubian Principalities were placed under the common protection of the United Kingdom of Great Britain and Ireland, the Second French Empire, Prussia, the Kingdom of Piedmont-Sardinia, the Austrian Empire, and the Russian Empire. Following the interest stirred by the apparent breakthrough of the document, Prince Grigore Alexandru Ghica ordered the document to be evaluated by a Commission of experts (comprising Mihail Kogălniceanu, August Treboniu Laurian and Constantin Negruzzi). The latter reported that the chronicle was a forgery, while supporters of the chronicle claimed the original had been lost.

According to historiographer Lucian Boia, the forgery was in clear connection to its historical context. The mention of a Dniester border since 274 was meant to emphasize historical rule over Bessarabia, a region since lost to Russia, while mention of republican customs was assigning Moldavia a democratic tradition. Furthermore, Boia argues, authors and supporters of the forgery had proof of Moldavian specificity as their political goal, and generally opposed projects of a union with Wallachia as they were being proposed by Partida Naţională and assessed by the Paris Conference—Asachi criticized the union, while Sion deemed it "a fools' project". In addition, the text supposedly written down by Clănău in 1495 made use of Romanian, aiming to transport first records of the language back by a few decades (see Neacşu's Letter); the analysis of the language used was the main clue in uncovering the forgery.

The chronicle, still argued by many to have been authentic, was notably used as a source by Ion Heliade Rădulescu in his Elemente de istoria românilor ("Elements of Romanian History", 1860), and ultimately proven spurious by linguist Alexandru Philippide in 1882.
