= Andrei Pippidi =

Romanian historian

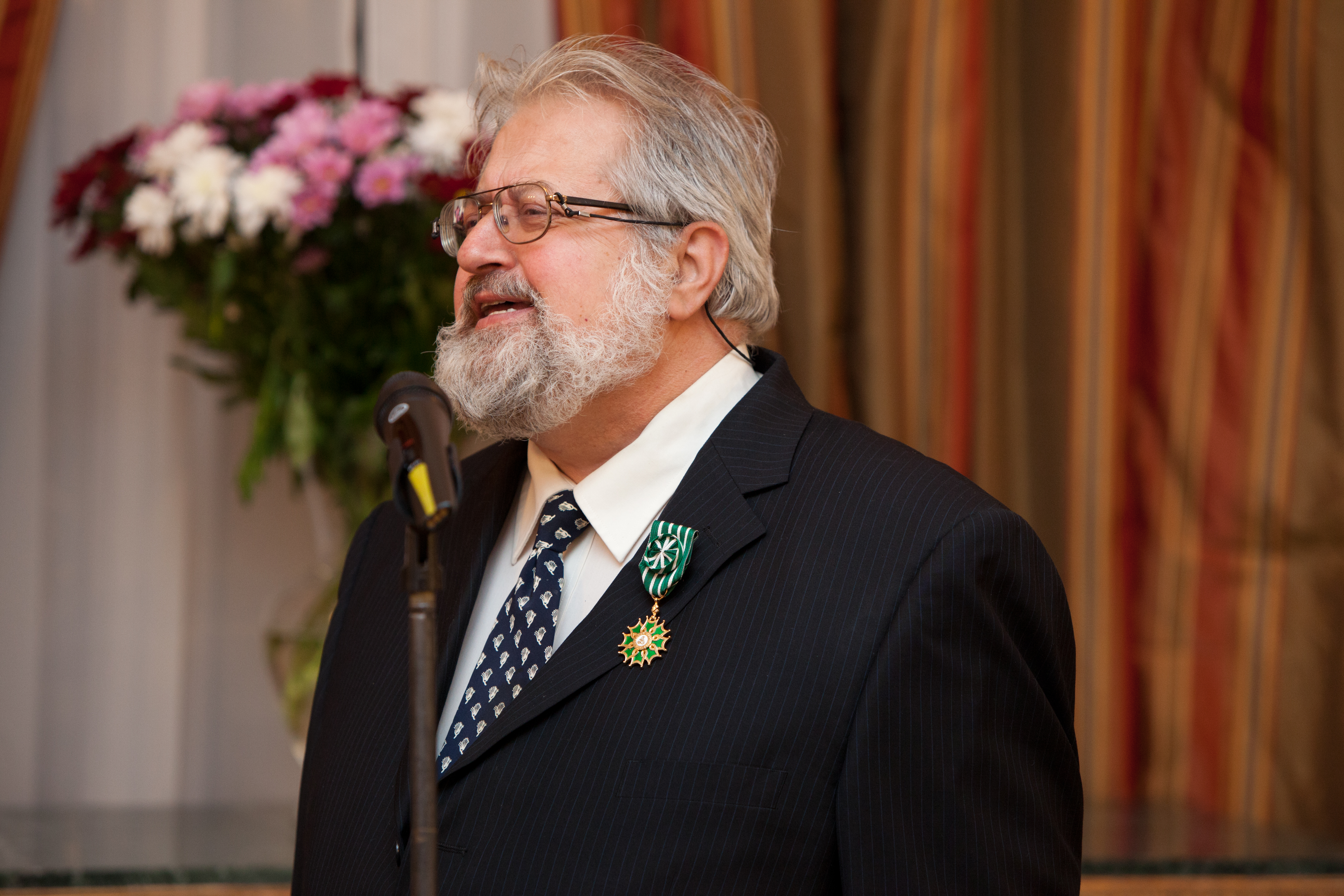
- Andrei Pippidi during the awarding ceremony of the Ordre des Arts et des Lettres in 2012
- Born: 12 March 1948 (age 78); Bucharest

Academic background
- Education: Babeș-Bolyai University (1981), Oxford University (1986)

Andrei-Nicolae Pippidi (born 12 March 1948, in Bucharest) is a Romanian historian and professor emeritus at the University of Bucharest. He specialised in South-Eastern European history of the 15th–19th century, in Romanian history of the Middle Ages and the Early Modern Period, and in the relationship between South-Eastern Europe and the Occident.

After graduating from the Faculty of History at the University of Bucharest, Pippidi was employed at the Institute of South Eastern European Studies in Bucharest from 1970. Additionally, he conducted research abroad, hosted by the Centre national de la recherche scientifique, Paris (1974 and 1978, with Pierre Chaunu and Jacques Le Goff), and Wolfson College, Oxford (1981–82). In 1981, he earned a doctoral degree at the Babeș-Bolyai University, Cluj-Napoca, 1986 at the University of Oxford (supervised by Hugh Trevor-Roper). In addition to his research at the Institute of South Eastern European Studies, Pippidi worked at the University of Bucharest from 1990, where he was appointed professor of medieval history in 1995. He was a visiting professor at Collegium Budapest (1995), Amsterdam University (1996), and Central European University, Budapest (1999). A member of various commissions in Romania and abroad, he was created knight of the French Ordre des Arts et des Lettres in 2012. 2016, he retired from his position at the University of Bucharest, while continuing to teach courses there.

In addition to his main activity as a medievalist, Pippidi became a founding member of the human rights organization Grupul pentru Dialog Social in 1990. He was a member of the international historic commission that created the Elie Wiesel Report on the Romanian participation in the Holocaust, as well as the Presidential Commission for the Analysis of the Communist Dictatorship in Romania led by Vladimir Tismăneanu. He strongly advocated the preservation of Bucharest's architectural monuments, publishing a journal column and a two-volume popular scientific work on this issue. He was elected a corresponding member of the Romanian Academy in 2012.

Pippidi's parents were the historian of antiquity Dionisie Pippidi and his wife Liliana. His maternal grandfather was Nicolae Iorga, a historian, homme des lettres and national conservative politician murdered by the fascist Iron Guard in 1940. Pippidi has edited Iorga's work. Iorga also founded the Institute of South Eastern European Studies, where Pippidi currently works. Andrei Pippidi is married to the political scientist Alina Mungiu-Pippidi.

== Select bibliography ==
=== Books published in Western languages ===
- — (1980). Hommes et idées du Sud-Est européen à l'aube de l'âge moderne. Bucureşti: Ed. Acad. [u.a.] ISBN 978-2-222-02584-9.
- — (2006). Byzantins, Ottomans, Roumains: le Sud-Est européen entre l'héritage impérial et les influences occidentales. Bibliothèque d'histoire moderne et contemporaine. Paris: H. Champion. ISBN 978-2-7453-1293-8.
- — (2012). Visions of the Ottoman world in Renaissance Europe. London: Hurst. ISBN 978-1-84904-199-7.

=== Books published in Romanian ===
- Contribuții la studiul legilor războiului în evul mediu, Bucharest (Editura militară) 1974.
- Tradiția politică bizantină în țările române în secolele XVI-XVIII, Bucharest (Editura Academiei Republicii Socialiste România) 1983 / 2nd, revised and extended edition Bucharest (Ed. Corint) 2001.
- Mihai Viteazul în arta epocii sale, Cluj-Napoca (Editura Dacia) 1987.
- România regilor, Bucharest (Editura Litera) 1994, ISBN 973-43-0162-4.
- Rezerva de speranță Bucharest (Editura Staff) 1995, ISBN 973-96111-5-1.
- Despre statui și morminte. Pentru o teorie a istoriei simbolice, Iași (Editura Polirom) 2000, ISBN 9736834697.
- București. Istorie și urbanism, Colecția București care au fost, Iași (Editura Do-MinoR) 2002, ISBN 9738590183.
- Case și oameni din București, 2 Bde., Bucharest (Editura Humanitas) 2012, ISBN 9789735035853 / ISBN 9789735035860.
