= Symbols of Romanian Royalty =

The symbols of Romanian Royalty consist of the five symbols of the supreme authority: the Royal Crown, the mace (the marshal's baton), the Royal Mantle, the Royal Standard and the Royal Cypher.

== History of the symbols ==
The Crown, as a symbol of power, can be found in the Romanian territories since the times of the Romanian rulers (Romanian: Domnitor), as main insignia of the supreme power. The crowns described in different representations, that can be seen in present times (such as paintings, portrayals, sculptures), are not real, this being the reason why the shapes of the crowns of such a wide variety. The crown had the role of symbolizing the sovereignty.

On the paintings made with the occasions of the numerous foundations, on some coins or tomb stones, the Wallachian and Moldavian Domnitori (Rulers) are represented (almost always) wearing a golden crown. This crown is usually an open princiary crown, formed by three or five ornaments shaped as flowers or leaves (Romanian: fleuroane). in the 14th and 15th centuries, the crowns of the Romanian Domnitor are similar to the heraldic crowns, in the latter centuries becoming bigger and more decorated. In the Phanariote period, the Phanariotes are rarely represented with a crown on the head, being sculpted or portrayed at the "crowning ceremony" (Romanian: ceremonia înscăunării - meaning the ceremonial of sitting on the Throne) with the Janissary headgear or with a special hat, of Turkish origin (Turkish: işlic; Romanian: işlic) at other solemn occasions. In the 19th century representations the crown is laid on a pillow or table in the proximity of the ruler's image.

Other signs of power are the mace and the sword. This symbols can be found on the coins, seals, coat of arms and standards of that time. The mace and the sword or shamshir were the main princely symbols until Alexandru Ioan Cuza. In some cases the Rulers are depicted with different symbols. Dimitrie Cantemir is one of them, being depicted with a short baton, similar to the Marshal's baton.

The first representation of a Romanian Domnitor with the symbols of authority appears on the coins of Mircea the Elder. He was represented wearing an open princiary crown, and dressed with a mantle (long up to the ankles) with ermine collar. In the right hand the Domnitor had a mace (sometimes a sword), and in the left hand a globus cruciger. The Rulers that followed him, both Wallachians and Moldavians, wore a similar mantle, called in Romanian: caftan. The Phanariotes wore a mantle called in Romanian: cabaniţa ienicerilor. The Romanian Rulers from the 19th century reintroduce the mantle as symbol of authority, but unlike the Mircea the Elder's ceremonial dress, these had a long tail.

The cyphers used by the Domnitori where formed by their initials. The signs where printed on small seals and on other objects. After 1834, the cyphers appear mostly on the flags (the battle/war flags).
