= Grigore Alexandru Ghica =

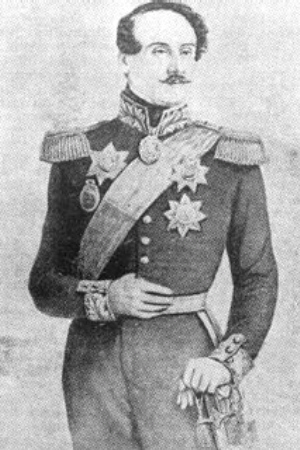
- Ghica in 1850

Prince of Moldavia
- 1st reign: 14 October 1849 – June 1853
- 2nd reign: 30 October 1854 – 3 June 1856
- Predecessor: Mihail Sturdza
- Successor: Alexandru Ioan Cuza
- Born: 1803 or 1807; Botoșani, Moldavia
- Died: 24 August 1857 (aged 49–54); Le Mée-sur-Seine, France
- Spouses: Helena Sturza (m. 1825; div. 1833); Anna Catargiu (m. 1833; died 1839); Marie Prudence Euphrosine Leroy (m. 1856)
- Issue: Constantin; Ion; Alexandru; Catinca; Aglaia; Natalia; Ioana; Grigore; Ferdinand
- House: Ghica
- Religion: Orthodox

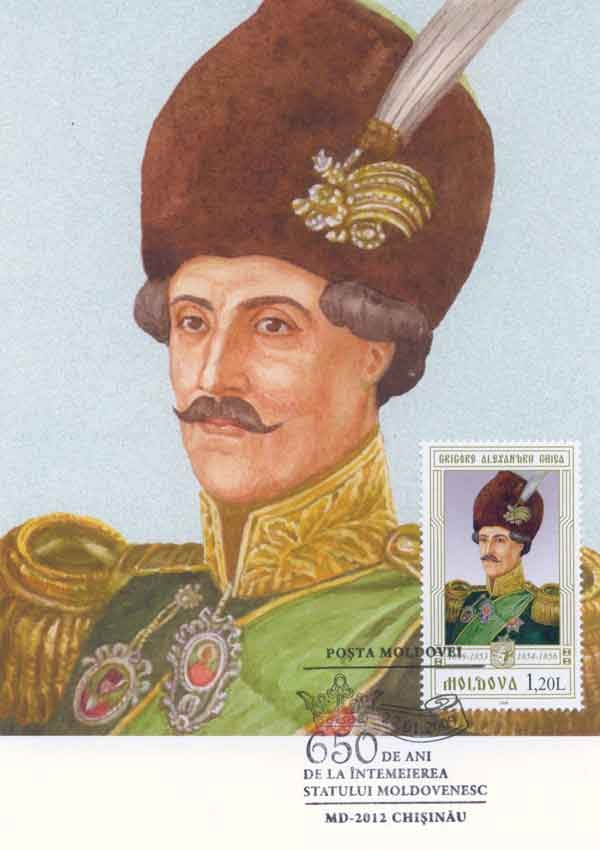
Grigore Alexandru Ghica on a 2008 Moldavian post card

Grigore Alexandru Ghica or Ghika (1803 or 1807 – 24 August 1857) was a Prince of Moldavia between 14 October 1849, and June 1853, and again between 30 October 1854, and 3 June 1856. His wife was Helena, a member of the Sturdza family and daughter of Ioan Sturdza, who had been Prince of Moldavia from 1822 to 1828.

== Biography ==
=== Early life and first rule ===
Born sometime between 1800 and 1810, Grigore Alexandru was a member of the Ghica family of boyars, and a descendant of Phanariotes. After being educated in France and the German Confederation, he returned to his native country and rallied with the nationalist and liberal opposition to Prince Mihail Sturdza under the Regulamentul Organic regime. Following the 1848 Revolution and Sturdza's deposition, despite his political choices, with Russia's approval, the Moldavian Divan appointed Ghica as ruler for a seven-year term (recognition from the Ottoman Empire, the country's other overseer, was obtained through the Convention of Balta Liman).

Soon after receiving the throne in Iași, Ghica carried out a series of moderate reforms, and prepared to implement more radical ones. He was responsible for creating a corps of Gendarmes (3 April 1850), which was to serve as an embryo for the present-day Romanian Gendarmerie. In 1851, he nominated the Transylvanian-born intellectual August Treboniu Laurian, himself a noted supporter of ethnic Romanian nationalism, as Inspector of the Schools in Moldavia. Additionally, his rule relaxed censorship, and became noted for an increase in literary activities.

Grigore Alexandru Ghica's program was ended by the Crimean War, when Russian troops occupied the Danubian Principalities as a means to attack the Ottoman Empire. Deposed in June 1853, he went into exile in October, crossing into the Austrian Empire and settling in Vienna. When occupying troops were forced to retreat the following year, and Russian influence remained marginal, he was allowed to regain his position, and attempted to fulfill his platform.

=== Second rule and reforms ===
As such, Ghica ordered the abolition of Roma slavery. This came at the end of a gradual process: since slaves owned by the state and the Orthodox Church had been set free by Mihail Sturdza in 1844, the order applied to the sizable category of privately owned Roma. The legislative project was drafted by Mihail Kogălniceanu and Petre Mavrogheni, and passed with the Divan's unanimous vote on 22 December 1855, providing compensation for all adult and able Roma, part of which was to be collected from former state-owned slaves. In the end, as the sums owed were threatening to drain state resources, payment was settled with state bonds (while 264 boyars agreed to free their slaves at no expense to the state). As many as 30,000 Roma or as few as 5,000 gained their freedom as a direct result of the move.

The order was the direct consequence of a public scandal involving the family of Dimitrie Cantacuzino-Pașcanu, who had been Moldavia's logofăt during the 1830s. Dimitrie's widow Profira had adopted and educated Dincă, a son of her husband's from an adulterous relationship with a Roma slave, who served the estate as a cook. As a result of his upbringing, Dincă had emancipated himself and was even allowed access to French high-society, when he accompanied Profira Cantacuzino to Paris. While there, he made the acquaintance of a chambermaid, Clémentine, who became his fiancée and agreed to accompany him back to Moldavia. Upon his return, Dincă's status as a slave was exposed — impressed by the situation, Ghica agreed to advocate his release, but met opposition from Profira Cantacuzino, who argued that Dincă reminded her of her deceased husband, and stressed that she could not allow him to grow estranged. Confronted with the news and aware that he would not be allowed to marry a free woman, Dincă shot his wife and then himself, an event which served to draw additional support for the abolitionist cause.

Ghica's overt approval of the nationalist program, which called for uniting Moldavia and Wallachia and implied measures to support Partida Națională's activities, provoked the opposition of Austria and the Ottoman Empire. During the late years of his rule, he appointed several Partida Națională representatives to government positions.

In 1856, Prince Grigore legislated an end to censorship and instituted freedom of the press. A notable cultural event during the later years of his rule was a debate over the authenticity of the Chronicle of Huru, a document which claimed to shed light on obscure events in Moldavian history, and which received ideological support from the anti-unionist Gheorghe Asachi. Ghica appointed a Commission of experts, comprising Laurian, Kogălniceanu, and Costache Negruzzi, which reported that the document was a forgery.

=== Later years and suicide ===
After his term expired, Ghica left the country and moved to Paris. In his place, after a short hiatus, the Porte appointed a Teodor Balș, with the title of Caimacam. A noted adversary of the unionist cause, Balș focused his attention on becoming titular Prince. Having retreated to his property in Le Mée-sur-Seine, the former ruler continued to advocate the union, which had by then been made more probable by the 1856 Treaty of Paris, and, to this end, attempted to determine the Second French Empire to issue formal approval for free and transparent elections to be carried out in Moldavia — annulling the electoral fraud carried out by Nicolae Vogoride (who had since replaced Balș). This brought him to the attention of anti-unionists, who began publicizing various inflammatory allegations in reference to Ghica. Feeling insulted by the arguments, Ghica also grew disenchanted by Emperor Napoleon III's refusal to grant him an audience (despite the fact that, by then, the French monarch had chosen to endorse new Moldavian elections).

He committed suicide in his home. Shortly before this, he drafted his last will, which was introduced by the statement:

"I am the victim of a foul deed and cannot live any longer, although I know myself to be completely innocent. The day shall come when truth will be exposed. I await my enemies in front of God's court."

== Legacy ==
Just two days after his death, Ottoman authorities agreed to overturn the elections sanctioned by Vogoride. When the Moldo-Wallachian union was effected by the 1859 double election of Alexandru Ioan Cuza, who reigned as Domnitor, Ghica's law on censorship served as a model for new legislation, and was generalized throughout Romania.

In recognition of his role in creating the Gendarmerie, the School for Subordinate Officers in Drăgășani (originally located in Bumbești-Jiu) was named after him.

A section Ion Creangă's book Amintiri din copilărie, which details the Prince's visit to the school in Târgu Neamț at a time when Creangă was a student there, contains an admiring portrait of Ghica ("handsome in features and gentle"), as well as a section of his speech on the occasion. Grigore Alexandru Ghica was the grandfather of Roman Catholic Archbishop Vladimir Ghika, who was a victim of the Romanian Communist regime.

| Preceded by Mihail Sturdza | Prince of Moldavia; 1849–1853 | Vacant Russian occupation |
| Vacant Russian occupation | Prince of Moldavia; 1854–1856 | Vacant Protectorate of European Powers Title next held by Alexandru Ioan Cuza |
