= Convention of Balta Liman =

1849 treaty between Russia and the Ottoman Empire

The Convention of Balta Liman of 1 May 1849 was an agreement between the Russian Empire and the Ottomans regulating the political situation of the two Danubian Principalities (the basis of present-day Romania), signed during the aftermath of the Revolutions of 1848.

Moldavia, which had been placed under Russian occupation in late spring 1848 following a revolutionary attempt, and Wallachia, where a liberal Provisional Government had briefly assumed power before facing a common Ottoman-Russian reaction, were confirmed their previous status of Ottoman suzerainty and Russian protectorate (first established in 1831–32 by the Regulamentul Organic). Minor provisions were added, signifying a relative increase in Ottoman influence—namely, hospodars were no longer elected by the local National Assemblies for life, and instead appointed by the Sublime Porte for seven-year terms. A common military presence was maintained until 1851. The document led to the appointment of Barbu Dimitrie Ştirbei as hospodar of Wallachia and Grigore Alexandru Ghica as hospodar of Moldavia. The Convention was rendered void by the Crimean War (during which the Principalities fell under Austrian occupation), and the statutory system itself was annulled by the 1856 Treaty of Paris.

== Sources ==
- Keith Hitchins, Românii, 1774–1866, Humanitas, Bucharest, 1998 (translation of the English-language edition The Romanians, 1774–1866, Oxford University Press, USA, 1996).
