= Teodor Balș =

- Born: August 1805
- Died: March 1, 1857 (aged 51)

Teodor Balș (August 1805 – 1 March 1857) was a caimacam (temporary replacement of Prince; from Turkish: kaymakam) who ruled Moldavia between 20 July 1856 and 1 March 1857. The Porte appointed him replacing the previous domnitor Grigore Alexandru Ghica, whose mandate finished after seven years. He closed institutions created by Grigore Alexandru Ghica, like the seminar and the gymnasium from Mănăstirea Neamț, the Law school from Iași, National bank and abolished the law press. He was against the unification of Moldavia with Walachia.
