= Sudiți =

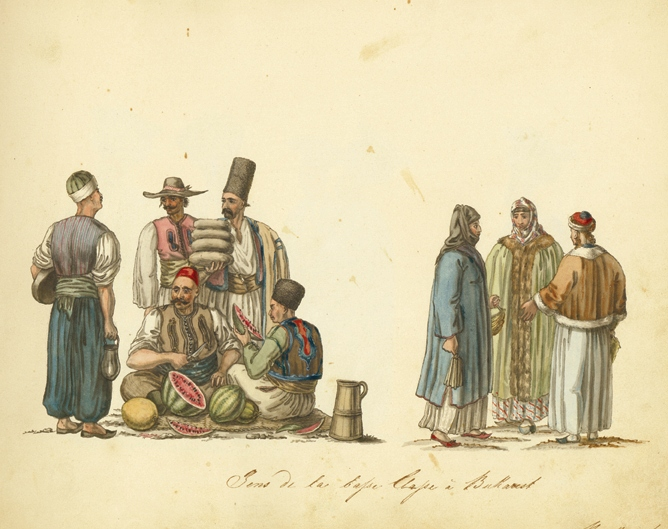
People in Bucharest in 1825

The Sudiți (plural of Sudit - Romanian language, from Italian suddito, meaning "subject" or "citizen") were inhabitants of the Danubian Principalities (Wallachia and Moldavia) who, for the latter stage of the 18th and a large part of the 19th century — during and after the Phanariote period of rule, were placed under the protection of foreign states (usually the Habsburg monarchy, Imperial Russia, and France) as reward for particular services or in exchange for payment.

Rights acquired included immunity from prosecution in front of both local rulers (hospodars) and the Principalities' suzerain power, the Ottoman Empire, as well as tax exemptions; the competing interests of nations involved allowed consuls to traffic sudiți favours and titles.

== History ==
The category was established by the 1774 Treaty of Küçük Kaynarca, which led to the creation of foreign consulates in Iași and Bucharest.

An expanding and powerful social category during the Russo-Turkish wars (which affected the Principalities' soil), many sudiți were wholesale businessmen who formed guilds (bresle or isnafuri) and successfully competed with Romanians in several fields (after the Treaty of Adrianople in 1829 allowed the two countries to engage in foreign trade), expanding during the period of Russian administration (1828-1857).

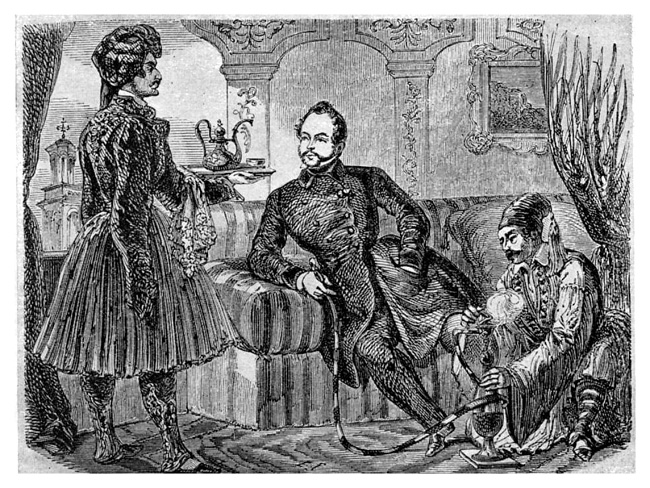
Adolphe Billecoq, French consul to Wallachia (1843)

Notable sudiți included Tudor Vladimirescu and Dimitrie Macedonski, leaders of the 1821 Wallachian uprising, as well as Ashkenazi Jews who had left various regions in Russia and the Austrian-ruled Kingdom of Galicia and Lodomeria.

The category disappeared after the 1878 Romanian War of Independence.

== See also ==
- History of Bucharest
- History of the Jews in Romania
