= Regulamentul Organic =

Quasi-constitutional organic law in Moldavia and Wallachia

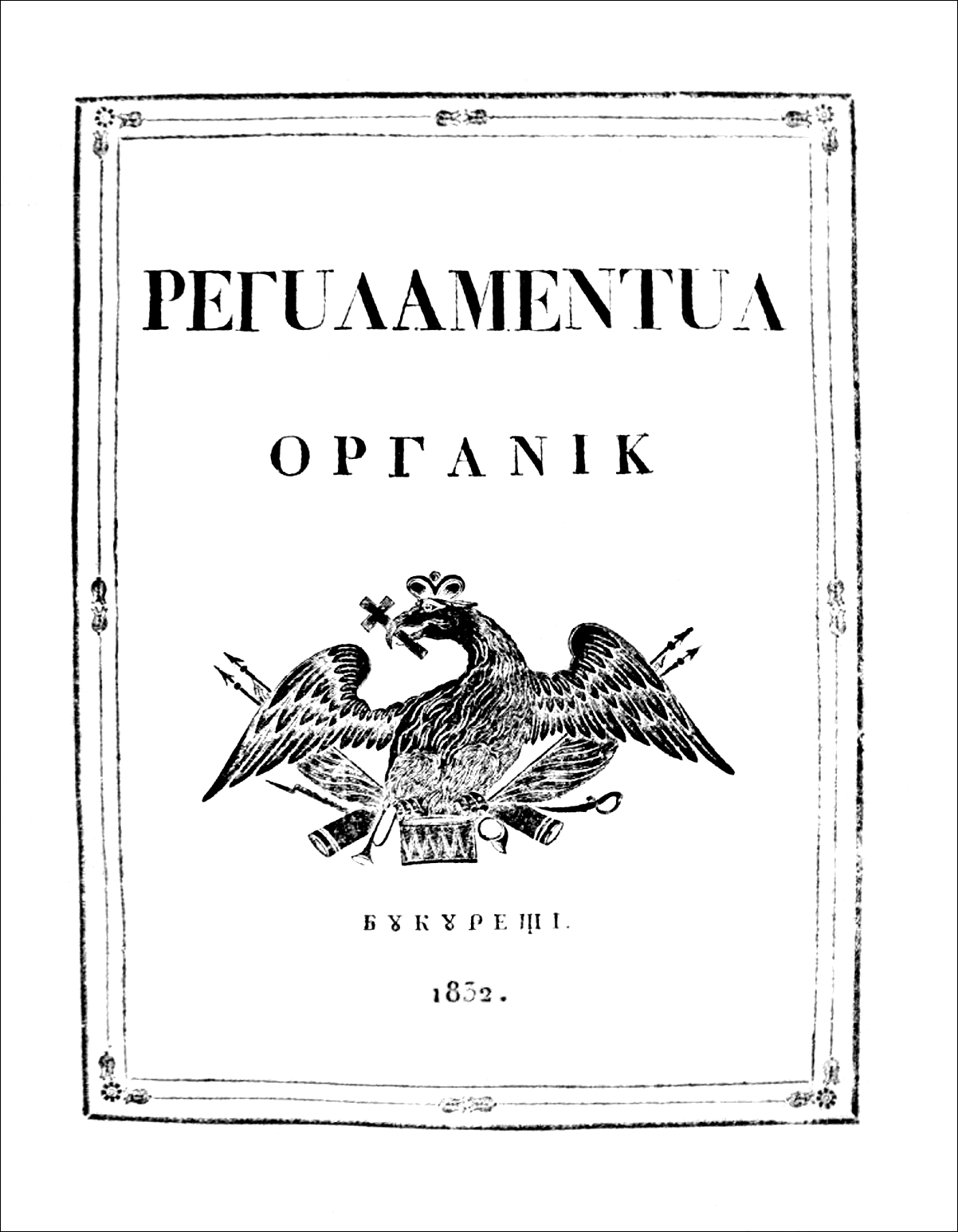
1832 Wallachian copy of Regulamentul Organic (printed РEГUЛAMENTUЛ OРГANIK in the Romanian transitional alphabet)

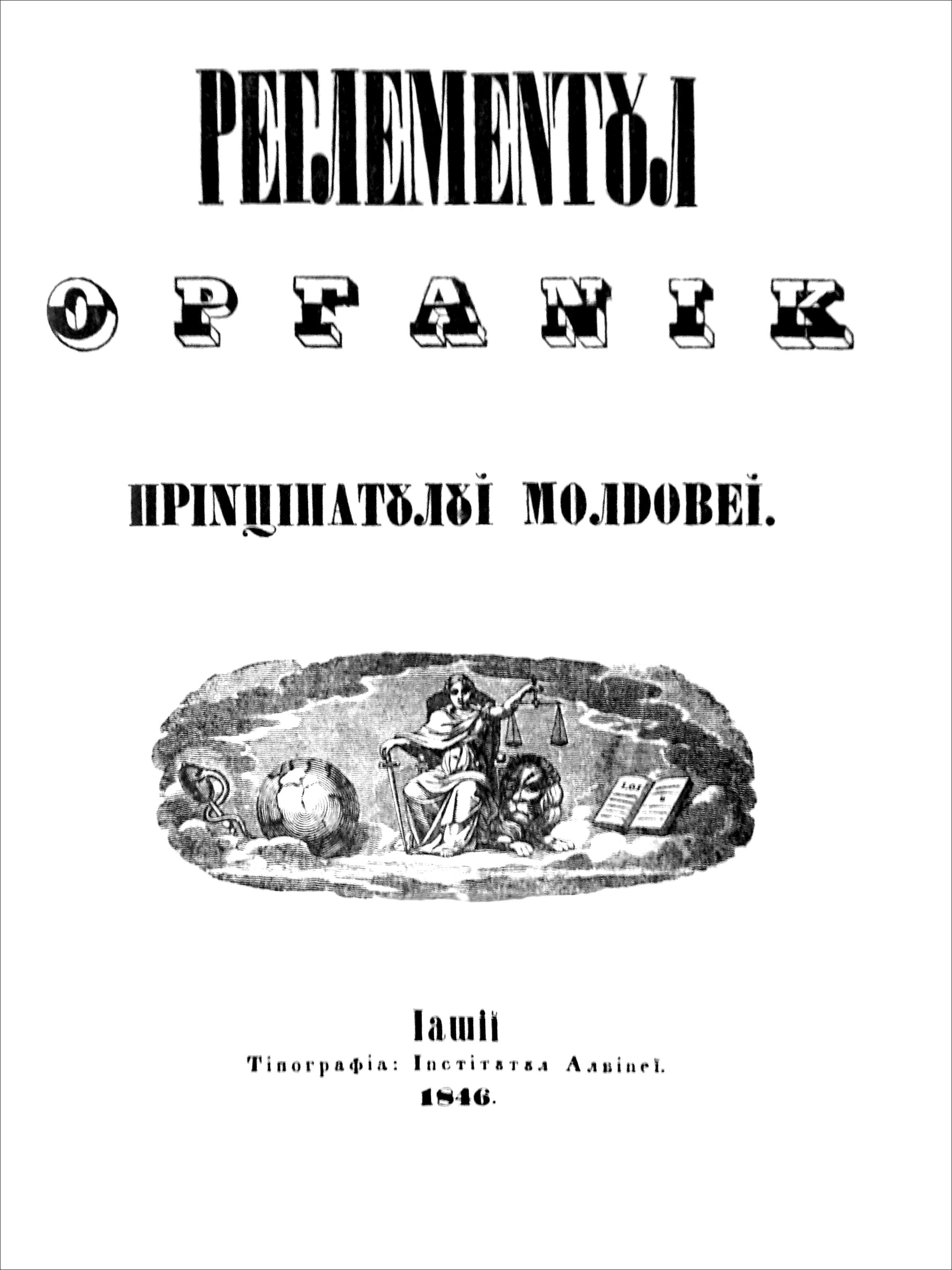
1846 Moldavian copy of the document (printed РEГЛЕМЕNТꙋЛ OРГANIK in the transitional alphabet)

Regulamentul Organic (Romanian: [reɡulaˈmentul orˈɡanik], English: Organic Regulation; French: Règlement Organique; Russian: Органический регламент, romanized: Organichesky reglament) was a quasi-constitutional organic law enforced in 1831–1832 by the Imperial Russian authorities in Moldavia and Wallachia (the two Danubian Principalities that were to become the basis of the modern Romanian state). The document partially confirmed the traditional government, including rule by the hospodars, and set up a common Russian protectorate which lasted until 1854. The Regulament itself remained in force until 1858. Conservative in its scope, it also engendered a period of unprecedented reforms which provided a setting for the Westernization of the local society. The Regulament offered the two Principalities their first common system of government.

== Background ==
The two principalities, owing tribute and progressively ceding political control to the Ottoman Empire since the Middle Ages, had been subject to frequent Russian interventions as early as the Russo-Turkish War (1710–1711), when a Russian army penetrated Moldavia and Emperor Peter the Great probably established links with the Wallachians. Eventually, the Ottomans enforced a tighter control on the region, effected under Phanariote hospodars (who were appointed directly by the Porte). Ottoman rule over the region remained contested by competition from Russia, which, as an Eastern Orthodox empire with claim to a Byzantine heritage, exercised notable influence over locals. At the same time, the Porte made several concessions to the rulers and boyars of Moldavia and Wallachia, as a means to ensure the preservation of its rule.

The Treaty of Küçük Kaynarca, signed in 1774 between the Ottomans and Russians, gave Russia the right to intervene on behalf of Eastern Orthodox subjects of the Ottomans in general, a right which it used to sanction Ottoman interventions in the Principalities in particular. Thus, Russia intervened to preserve reigns of hospodars who had lost Ottoman approval in the context of the Napoleonic Wars (the casus belli for the 1806–12 conflict), and remained present in the Danubian states, vying for influence with the Austrian Empire well into the 19th century and annexing Moldavia's Bessarabia in 1812.

Despite the influx of Greeks, arriving in the Principalities as a new bureaucracy favored by the hospodars, the traditional Estates of the realm (the Divan) remained under the tight control of a number of high boyar families, who, while intermarrying with members of newly arrived communities, opposed reformist attempts—and successfully preserved their privileges by appealing against their competitors to both Istanbul and Saint Petersburg.

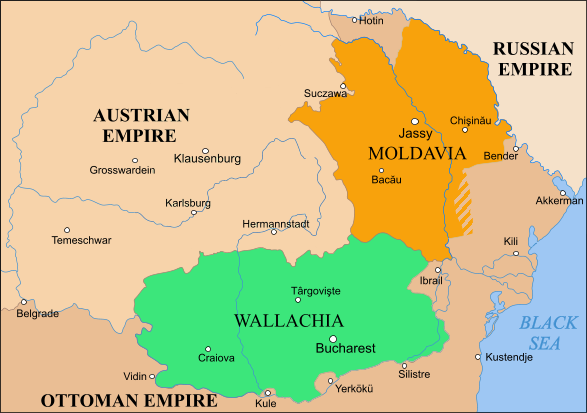
Moldavia (in orange) and Wallachia (in green), between 1793 and 1812

In the last decades of the 18th century, the growing strategic importance of the region brought about the establishment of consulates representing European powers directly interested in observing local developments (Russia, the Austrian Empire, and France; later, British and Prussian ones were opened). An additional way for consuls to exercise particular policies was the awarding of a privileged status and protection to various individuals, who were known as sudiți ("subjects", in the language of the time) of one or the other of the foreign powers.

A seminal event occurred in 1821, when the rise of Greek nationalism in various parts of the Balkans in connection with the Greek War of Independence led to occupation of the two states by the Filiki Eteria, a Greek secret society who sought, and initially obtained, Russian approval. A mere takeover of the government in Moldavia, the Eterist expedition met a more complex situation in Wallachia, where a regency of high boyars attempted to have the anti-Ottoman Greek nationalists confirm both their rule and the rejection of Phanariote institutions. A compromise was achieved through their common support for Tudor Vladimirescu, an Oltenian pandur leader who had already instigated an anti-Phanariote rebellion (as one of the Russian sudiți, it was hoped that Vladimirescu could assure Russia that the revolt was not aimed against its influence). However, the eventual withdrawal of Russian support made Vladimirescu seek a new agreement with the Ottomans, leaving him to be executed by an alliance of Eterists and weary locals (alarmed by his new anti-boyar program); after the Ottomans invaded the region and crushed the Eteria, the boyars, still perceived as a third party, obtained from the Porte an end to the Phanariote system.

== Akkerman Convention and Treaty of Adrianople ==
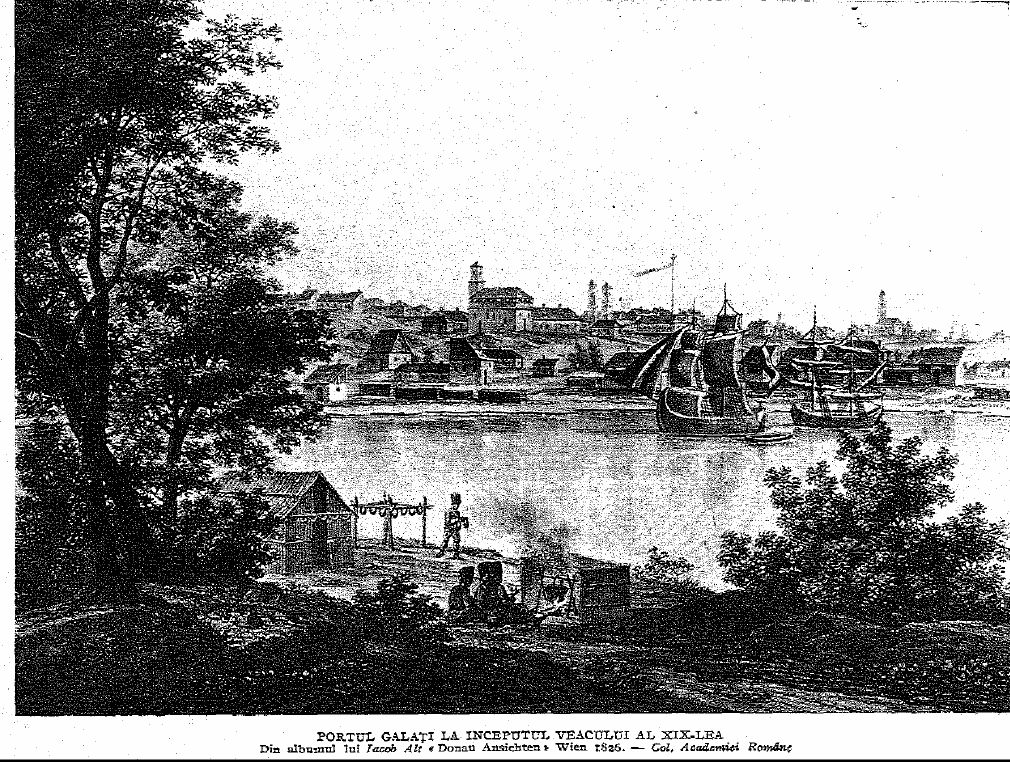
The Moldavian Danube port of Galați (1826)

The first reigns through locals—Ioniță Sandu Sturdza as Prince of Moldavia and Grigore IV Ghica as Prince of Wallachia—were, in essence, short-lived: although the patron-client relation between Phanariote hospodars and a foreign ruler was never revived, Sturdza and Ghica were deposed by the Russian military intervention during the Russo-Turkish War, 1828–1829. Sturdza's time on the throne was marked by an important internal development: the last in a series of constitutional proposals, advanced by boyars as a means to curb princely authority, ended in a clear conflict between the rapidly decaying class of low-ranking boyars (already forming the upper level of the middle class rather than a segment of the traditional nobility) and the high-ranking families who had obtained the decisive say in politics. The proponent, Ionică Tăutu, was defeated in the Divan after the Russian consul sided with the conservatives (expressing the official view that the aristocratic-republican and liberal aims of the document could have threatened international conventions in place).

On 7 October 1826, the Ottoman Empire—anxious to prevent Russia's intervention in the Greek Independence War—negotiated with it a new status for the region in Akkerman, one which conceded to several requests of the inhabitants: the resulting Akkerman Convention was the first official document to nullify the principle of Phanariote reigns, instituting seven-year terms for new princes elected by the respective Divans, and awarding the two countries the right to engage in unrestricted international trade (as opposed to the tradition of limitations and Ottoman protectionism, it only allowed Istanbul to impose its priorities in the grain trade). The convention also made the first mention of new Statutes, enforced by both powers as governing documents, which were not drafted until after the war—although both Sturdza and Ghica had appointed commissions charged with adopting such projects.

The Russian military presence on the Principalities' soil was inaugurated in the first days of the war: by late April 1828, the Russian army of Peter Wittgenstein had reached the Danube (in May, it entered present-day Bulgaria). The campaign, prolonged for the following year and coinciding with devastating bubonic plague and cholera epidemics (which together killed around 1.6% of the population in both countries), soon became a drain on local economy: according to British observers, the Wallachian state was required to indebt itself to European creditors for a total sum of ten million piastres, in order to provide for the Russian army's needs. Accusations of widespread plunder were made by the French author Marc Girardin, who travelled in the region during the 1830s; Girardin alleged that Russian troops had confiscated virtually all cattle for their needs, and that Russian officers had insulted the political class by publicly stating that, in case the supply in oxen was to prove insufficient, boyars were to be tied to carts in their place—an accusation backed by Ion Ghica in his recollections. He also recorded a mounting dissatisfaction with the new rule, mentioning that peasants were especially upset by the continuous maneuvers of troops inside the Principalities' borders. Overall, Russophilia in the two Principalities appears to have suffered a major blow. Despite the confiscations, statistics of the time indicated that the pace of growth in heads of cattle remained steady (a 50% growth appears to have occurred between 1831 and 1837).

The Treaty of Adrianople, signed on 14 September 1829, confirmed both the Russian victory and the provisions of the Akkerman Convention, partly amended to reflect the Russian political ascendancy over the area. Furthermore, Wallachia's southern border was settled on the Danube thalweg, and the state was given control over the previously Ottoman-ruled ports of Brăila, Giurgiu, and Turnu Măgurele. The freedom of commerce (which consisted mainly of grain exports from the region) and freedom of navigation on the river and on the Black Sea were passed into law, allowing for the creation of naval fleets in both Principalities in the following years, as well as for a more direct contact with European traders, with the confirmation of the Moldavia and Wallachia's commercial privileges first stipulated at Akkerman (alongside the tight links soon established with Austrian and Sardinian traders, the first French ships visited Wallachia in 1830).

Russian occupation over Moldavia and Wallachia (as well as the Bulgarian town of Silistra) was prolonged pending the payment of war reparations by the Ottomans. Emperor Nicholas I assigned Fyodor Pahlen as governor over the two countries before the actual peace, as the first in a succession of three Plenipotentiary Presidents of the Divans in Moldavia and Wallachia, and official supervisor of the two commissions charged with drafting the Statutes. The bodies, having for secretaries Gheorghe Asachi in Moldavia and Barbu Dimitrie Știrbei in Wallachia, had resumed their work while the cholera epidemic was still raging, and continued it after Pahlen had been replaced with Pyotr Zheltukhin in February 1829.

== Adoption and character ==
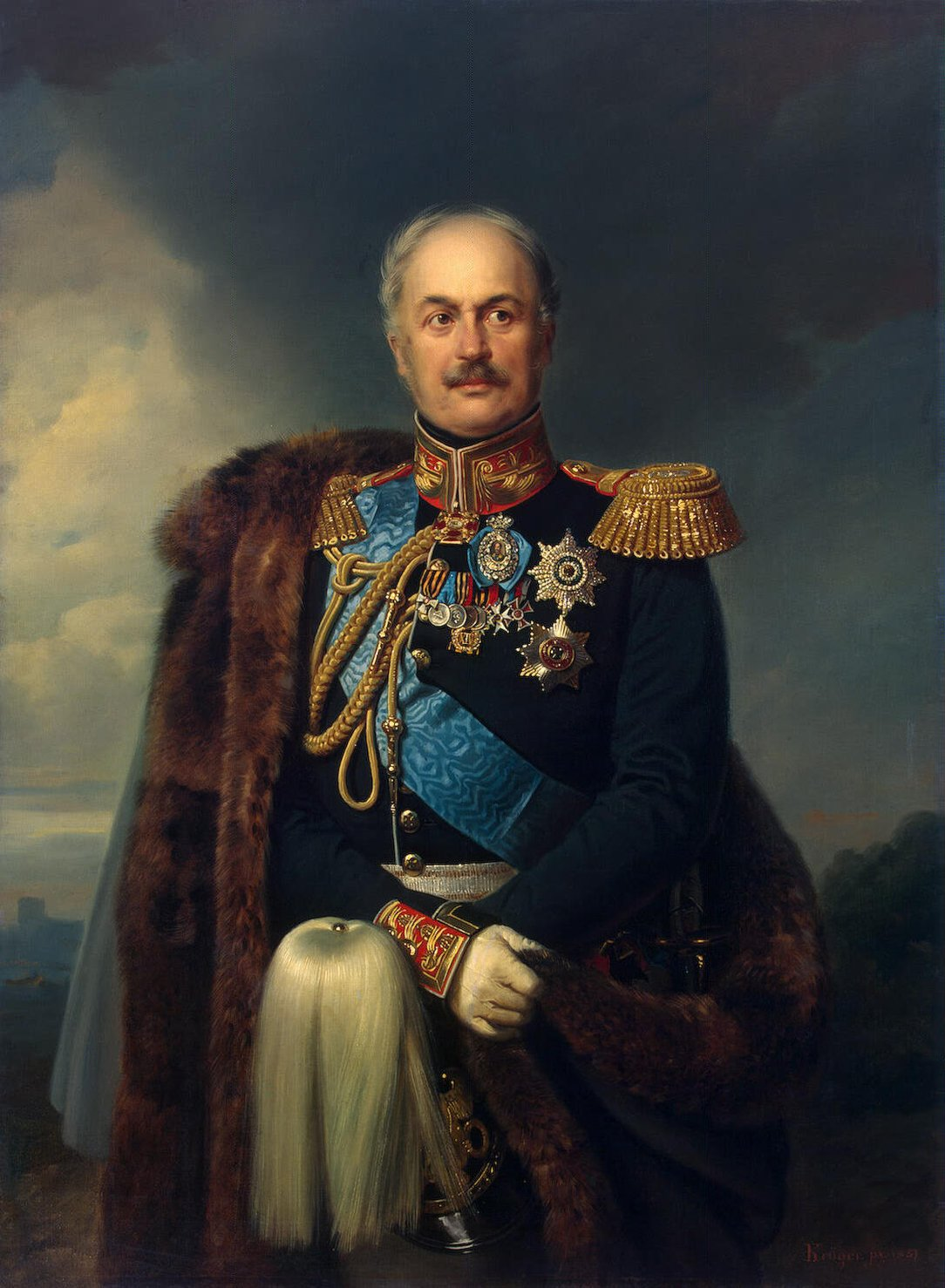
Pavel Kiselyov

The post-Adrianople state of affairs was perceived by many of the inhabitants of Wallachia and Moldavia as exceptionally abusive, given that Russia confiscated both of the Principalities' treasuries, and that Zheltukhin used his position to interfere in the proceedings of the commission, nominated his own choice of members, and silenced all opposition by having anti-Russian boyars expelled from the countries (including, notably, Iancu Văcărescu, a member of the Wallachian Divan who had questioned his methods of government). According to the radical Ghica, "General Zheltukhin [and his subordinates] defended all Russian abuse and injustice. Their system consisted in never listening to complaints, but rather rushing in with accusations, so as to inspire fear, so as the plaintiff would run away for fear of not having to endure a harsher thing than the cause of his [original] complaint". However, the same source also indicated that this behaviour was hiding a more complex situation: "Those who nevertheless knew Zheltukhin better… said that he was the fairest, most honest, and most kind of men, and that he gave his cruel orders with an aching heart. Many gave assurance that he had addressed to the emperor heart-breaking reports on the deplorable state in which the Principalities were to be found, in which he stated that Russia's actions in the Principalities deserved the scorn of the entire world".

The third and last Russian governor, Pavel Kiselyov (or Kiseleff), took office on 19 October 1829, and faced his first major task in dealing with the last outbreaks of plague and cholera, as well as the threat of famine, with which he dealt by imposing quarantines and importing grain from Odessa. His administration, lasting until 1 April 1834, was responsible for the most widespread and influential reforms of the period, and coincided with the actual enforcement of the new legislation. The earliest of Kiselyov's celebrated actions was the convening of the Wallachian Divan in November 1829, with the assurance that abuses were not to be condoned anymore.

In 1829, two drafting commissions were formed, a Moldavian and a Wallachian one, which began working on Regulamentul Organic in Bucharest. Their work was finished on 11 April 1830 (March 30, OS) when the final text of the project was written. The documents were then sent to Saint Petersburg by a delegation consisting of Alexandru Vilara, Mihail Sturdza, Gheorghe Asachi, as well as two Russian officials, under the leadership of State Secretary Daschkoff. Regulamentul Organic was adopted in its two very similar versions on 13 July 1831 (July 1, OS) in Wallachia and 13 January 1832 (1 January, OS) in Moldavia, after having minor changes applied to it in Saint Petersburg where it was assessed further. Its ratification by Sultan Mahmud II was not a requirement from Kiselyov's perspective, who began enforcing it as a fait accompli before this was granted. The final version of the document sanctioned the first local government abiding by the principles of separation and balance of powers. The hospodars, elected for life (and not for the seven-year term agreed in the Convention of Akkerman) by an Extraordinary Assembly which comprised representatives of merchants and guilds, stood for the executive, with the right to nominate ministers (whose offices were still referred to using the traditional titles of courtiers) and public officials; hospodars were to be voted in office by an electoral college with a confirmed majority of high-ranking boyars (in Wallachia, only 70 persons were members of the college).

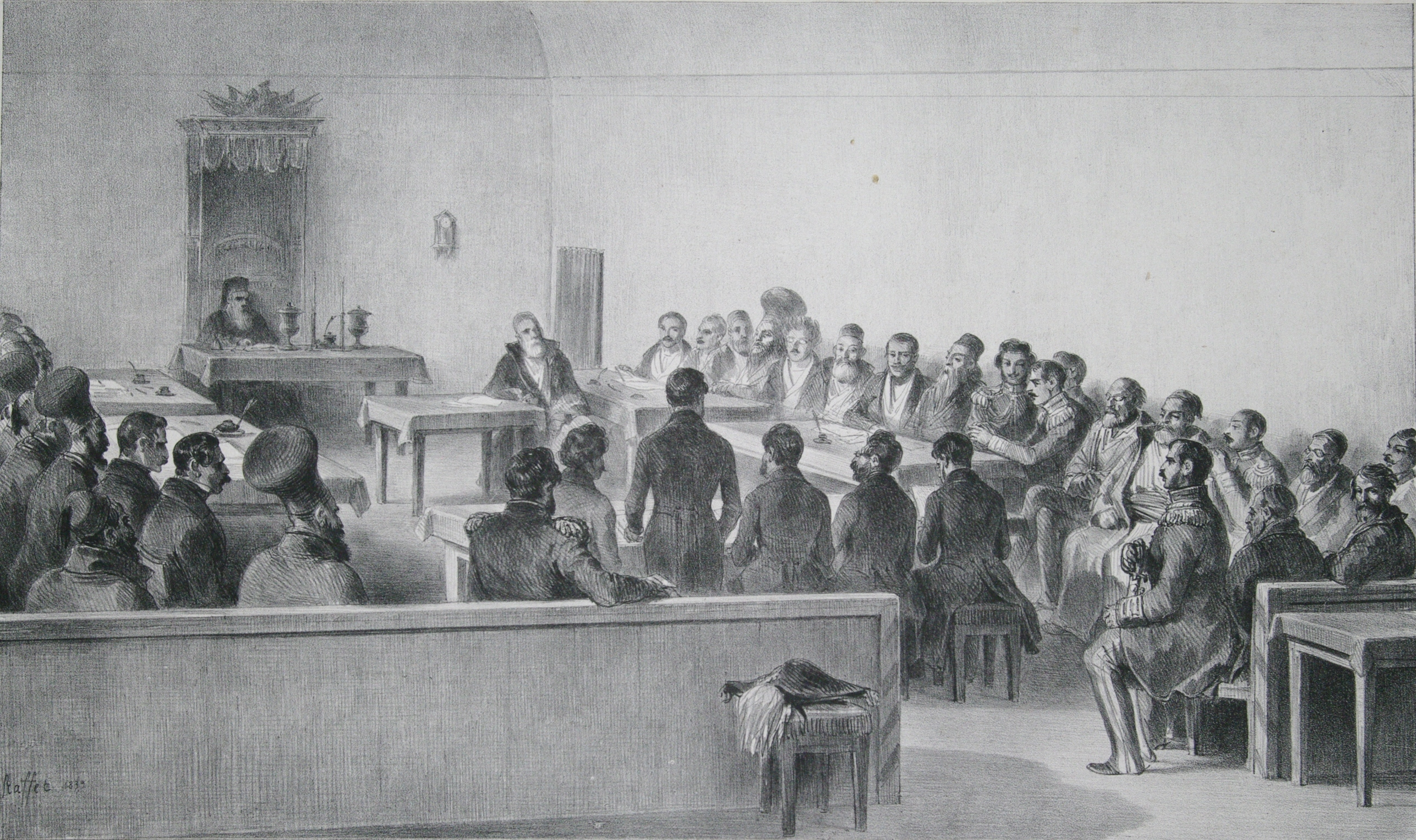
The National Assembly of Wallachia in 1837

Each National Assembly (approximate translation of Adunarea Obștească), inaugurated in 1831–32, was a legislature itself under the control of high-ranking boyars, comprising 35 (in Moldavia) or 42 members (in Wallachia), voted into office by no more than 3,000 electors in each state; the judiciary was, for the very first time, removed from the control of hospodars. In effect, the Regulament confirmed earlier steps leading to the eventual separation of church and state, and, although Orthodox church authorities were confirmed a privileged position and a political say, the religious institution was closely supervised by the government (with the establishment of a quasi-salary expense).

A fiscal reform ensued, with the creation of a poll tax (calculated per family), the elimination of most indirect taxes, annual state budgets (approved by the Assemblies) and the introduction of a civil list in place of the hospodars' personal treasuries. New methods of bookkeeping were regulated, and the creation of national banks was projected, but, like the adoption of national fixed currencies, was never implemented.

According to the historian Nicolae Iorga, "The [boyar] oligarchy was appeased [by the Regulament's adoption]: a beautifully harmonious modern form had veiled the old medieval structure…. The bourgeoisie… held no influence. As for the peasant, he lacked even the right to administer his own commune, he was not even allowed to vote for an Assembly deemed, as if in jest, «national»." Nevertheless, conservative boyars remained suspicious of Russian tutelage, and several expressed their fear that the regime was a step leading to the creation of a regional guberniya for the Russian Empire. Their mistrust was, in time, reciprocated by Russia, which relied on hospodars and the direct intervention of its consuls to push further reforms. Kiselyov himself voiced a plan for the region's annexation to Russia, but the request was dismissed by his superiors.

== Economic trends ==
=== Cities and towns ===
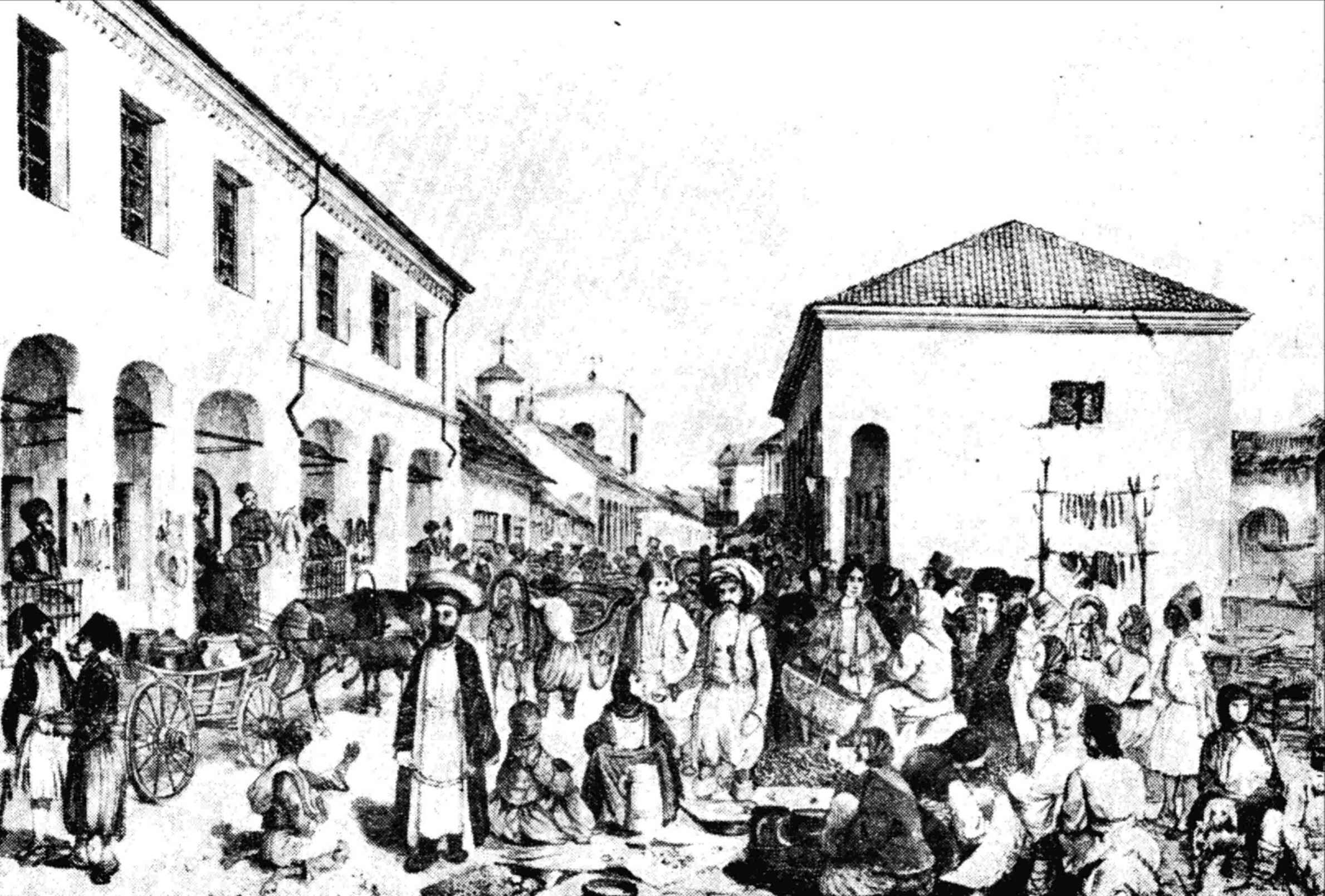
A cosmopolitan fair in Iași (c. 1845)

Beginning with the reformist administration of Kiselyov, the two countries experienced a series of profound changes, political, social, as well as cultural.

Despite underrepresentation in politics, the middle class swelled in numbers, profiting from a growth in trade which had increased the status of merchants. Under continuous competition from the sudiți, traditional guilds (bresle or isnafuri) faded away, leading to a more competitive, purely capitalist environment. This nevertheless signified that, although the traditional Greek competition for Romanian merchants and artisans had become less relevant, locals continued to face one from Austrian subjects of various nationalities, as well as from a sizeable immigration of Jews from the Kingdom of Galicia and Lodomeria and Russia—prevented from settling in the countryside, Jews usually became keepers of inns and taverns, and later both bankers and leaseholders of estates. In this context, an anti-Catholic sentiment was growing, based, according to Keith Hitchins, on the assumption that Catholicism and Austrian influence were closely related, as well as on a widespread preference for secularism.

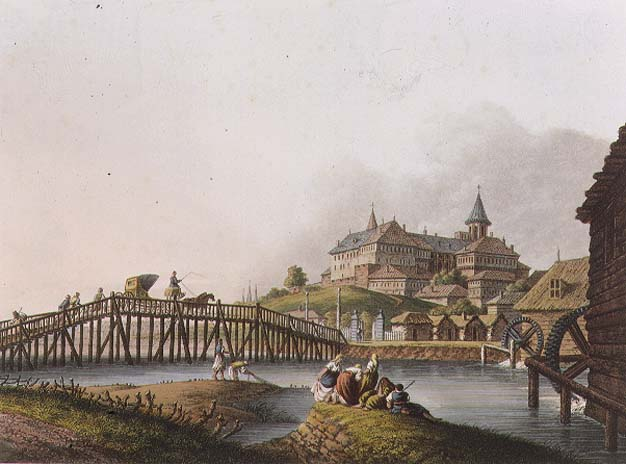
A bridge in Bucharest (1837)

The Romanian middle class formed the basis for what was to become the liberal electorate, and accounted for the xenophobic discourse of the National Liberal Party during the latter's first decade of existence (between 1875 and World War I).

Urban development occurred at a very fast pace: overall, the urban population had doubled by 1850. Population estimates for Bucharest, the capital of Wallachia, were about 70,000 inhabitants in 1831, 60,000 in 1851, and about 120,000 in 1859. For Iași, the capital of Moldavia, the estimates were 60,000 inhabitants for 1831, 70,000 for 1851, and about 65,000 for 1859. Brăila and Giurgiu, Danube ports returned to Wallachia by the Ottomans, as well as Moldavia's Galați, grew from the grain trade to become prosperous cities. Kiselyov, who had centered his administration on Bucharest, paid full attention to its development, improving its infrastructure and services and awarding it, together with all other cities and towns, a local administration (see History of Bucharest). Public works were carried out in the urban sphere, as well as in the massive expansion of the transport and communications system.

=== Countryside ===
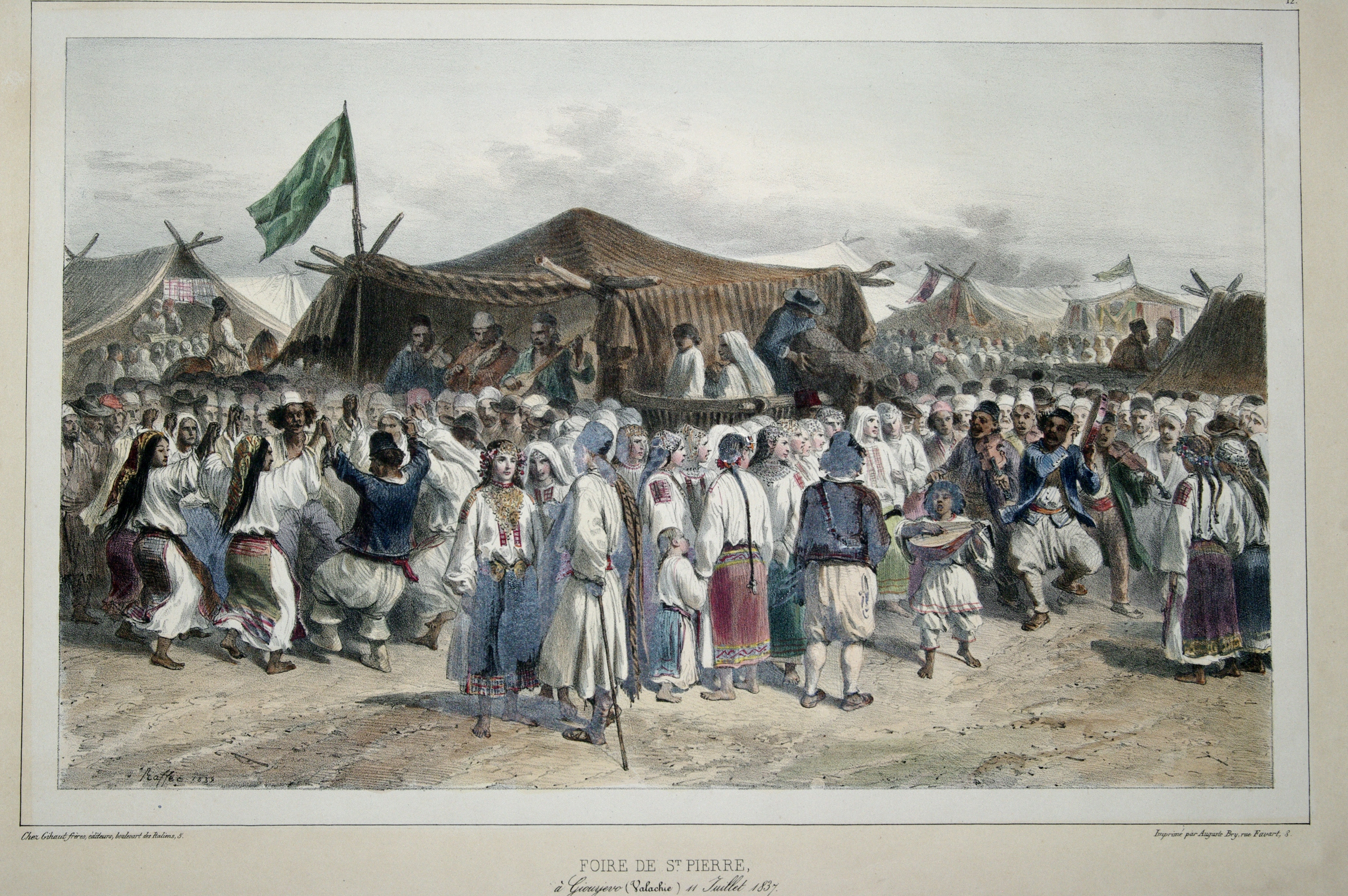
A peasant fair in the Wallachian city of Giurgiu (1837)

The success of the grain trade was secured by a conservative take on property, which restricted the right of peasants to exploit for their own gain those plots of land they leased on boyar estates (the Regulament allowed them to consume around 70% of the total harvest per plot leased, while boyars were allowed to use a third of their estate as they pleased, without any legal duty toward the neighbouring peasant workforce); at the same time, small properties, created after Constantine Mavrocordatos had abolished serfdom in the 1740s, proved less lucrative in the face of competition by large estates—boyars profited from the consequences, as more landowning peasants had to resort to leasing plots while still owing corvées to their lords. Confirmed by the Regulament at up to 12 days a year, the corvée was still less significant than in other parts of Europe; however, since peasants relied on cattle for alternative food supplies and financial resources, and pastures remained the exclusive property of boyars, they had to exchange right of use for more days of work in the respective boyar's benefit (as much as to equate the corresponding corvée requirements in Central European countries, without ever being enforced by laws). Several laws of the period display a particular concern in limiting the right of peasants to evade corvées by paying their equivalent in currency, thus granting the boyars a workforce to match a steady growth in grain demands on foreign markets.

In respect to pasture access, the Regulament divided peasants into three wealth-based categories: fruntași ("foremost people"), who, by definition, owned 4 working animals and one or more cows (allowed to use around 4 hectares of pasture); mijlocași ("middle people")—two working animals and one cow (around 2 hectares); codași ("backward people")—people who owned no property, and not allowed the use of pastures.

At the same time, the major demographic changes took their toll on the countryside. For the very first time, food supplies were no longer abundant in front of a population growth ensured by, among other causes, the effective measures taken against epidemics; rural–urban migration became a noticeable phenomenon, as did the relative increase in urbanization of traditional rural areas, with an explosion of settlements around established fairs.

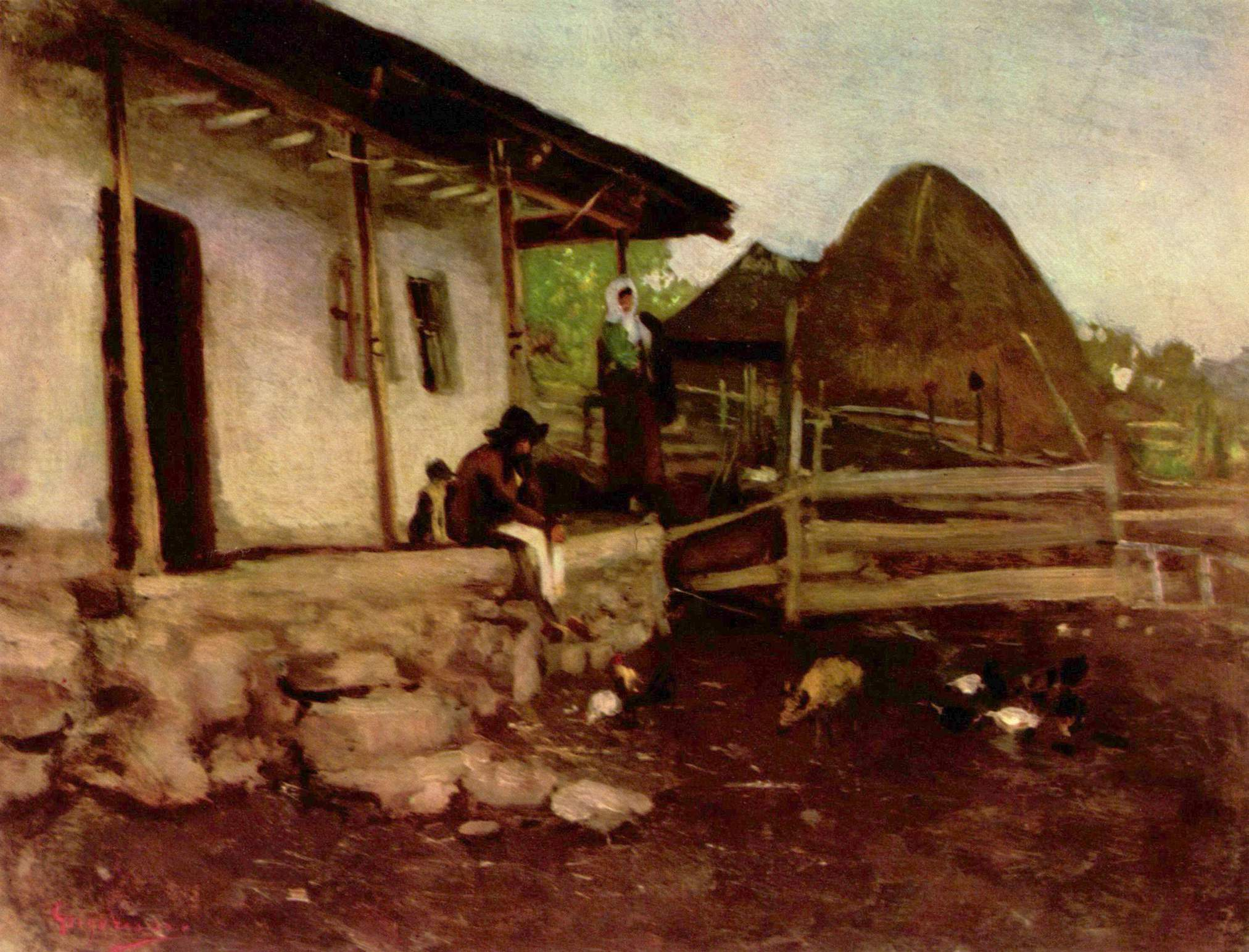
Nicolae Grigorescu's Countryside courtyard, depicting a typical peasant lodging in the 19th century

These processes also ensured that industrialization was minimal (although factories had first been opened during the Phanariotes): most revenues came from a highly productive agriculture based on peasant labour, and were invested back into agricultural production. In parallel, hostility between agricultural workers and landowners mounted: after an increase in lawsuits involving leaseholders and the decrease in quality of corvée outputs, resistance, hardened by the examples of Tudor Vladimirescu and various hajduks, turned to sabotage and occasional violence. A more serious incident occurred in 1831, when around 60,000 peasants protested against projected conscription criteria; Russian troops dispatched to quell the revolt killed around 300 people.

== Political and cultural setting ==
The most noted cultural development under the Regulament was Romanian Romantic nationalism, in close connection with Francophilia. Institutional modernization engendered a renaissance of the intelligentsia. In turn, the concept of "nation" was first expanded beyond its coverage of the boyar category, and more members of the privileged displayed a concern in solving problems facing the peasantry: although rarer among the high-ranking boyars, the interest was shared by most progressive political figures by the 1840s.

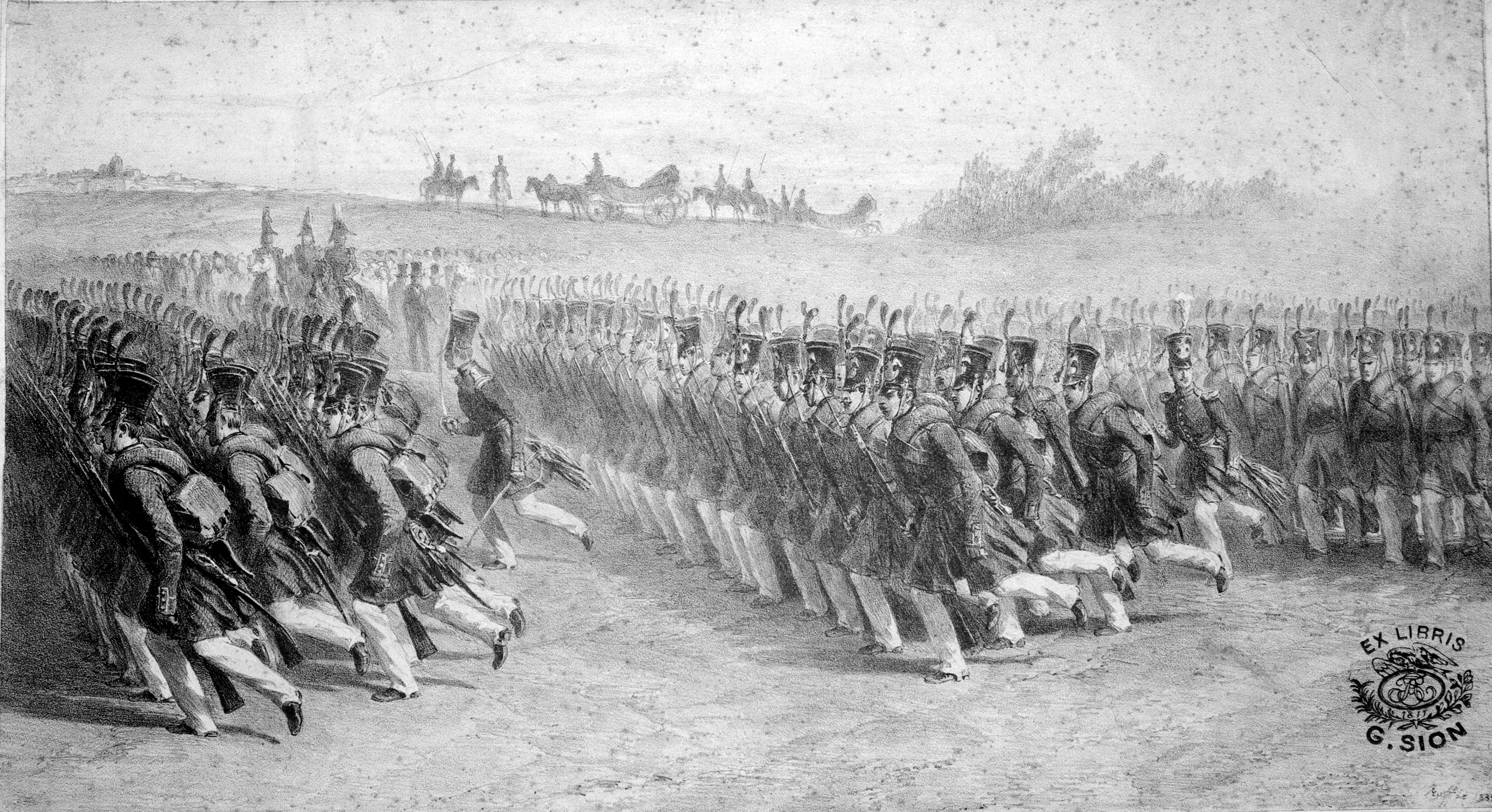
The Wallachian militia maneuvering in 1837

Nationalist themes now included a preoccupation for the Latin origin of Romanians and the common (but since discarded) reference to the entire region as Dacia (first notable in the title of Mihail Kogălniceanu's Dacia Literară, a short-lived Romantic literary magazine published in 1840). As a trans-border notion, Dacia also indicated a growth in Pan-Romanian sentiment—the latter had first been present in several boyar requests of the late 18th century, which had called for the union of the two Danubian Principalities under the protection of European powers (and, in some cases, under the rule of a foreign prince). To these was added the circulation of fake documents which were supposed to reflect the text of Capitulations awarded by the Ottoman Empire to its Wallachian and Moldavian vassals in the Middle Ages, claiming to stand out as proof of rights and privileges which had been long neglected (see also Islam in Romania).

Education, still accessible only to the wealthy, was first removed from the domination of the Greek language and Hellenism upon the disestablishment of Phanariotes sometime after 1821; the attempts of Gheorghe Lazăr (at the Saint Sava College) and Gheorghe Asachi to engender a transition towards Romanian-language teaching had been only moderately successful, but Wallachia became the scene of such a movement after the start of Ion Heliade Rădulescu's teaching career and the first issue of his newspaper, Curierul Românesc. Moldavia soon followed, after Asachi began printing his highly influential magazine Albina Românească. The Regulament brought about the creation of new schools, which were dominated by the figures of Transylvanian Romanians who had taken exile after expressing their dissatisfaction with Austrian rule in their homeland—these teachers, who usually rejected the adoption of French cultural models in the otherwise conservative society (viewing the process as an unnatural one), counted among them Ioan Maiorescu and August Treboniu Laurian. The Moldavian Regulation stipulated in article 421: "The course of all teachings will be in the Moldavian language, not only for the facilitation of the pupils and the cultivation of the language and the homeland, but also for the word that all public causes must be translated in this language, which the inhabitants use in church celebrations." Another impetus for nationalism was the Russian-supervised creation of small standing armies (occasionally referred to as "militias"; see Moldavian military forces and Wallachian military forces). The Wallachian one first maneuvered in the autumn of 1831, and was supervised by Kiselyov himself. According to Ion Ghica, the prestige of military careers had a relevant tradition: "Only the arrival of the Muscovites [sic] in 1828 ended [the] young boyars' sons flighty way of life, as it made use of them as commissioners (mehmendari) in the service of Russian generals, in order to assist in providing the troops with [supplies]. In 1831 most of them took to the sword, signing up for the national militia."

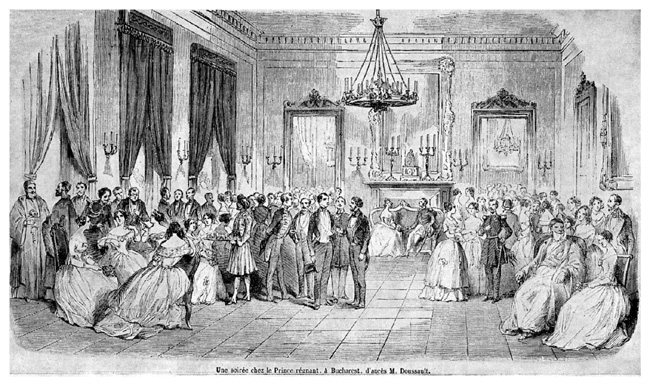
A soirée at the Princely Palace in Bucharest (1842)

The Westernization of Romanian society took place at a rapid pace, and created a noticeable, albeit not omnipresent, generation gap. The paramount cultural model was the French one, following a pattern already established by contacts between the region and the French Consulate and First Empire (attested, among others, by the existence of a Wallachian plan to petition Napoleon Bonaparte, whom locals believed to be a descendant of the Byzantine Emperors, with a complaint against the Phanariotes, as well as by an actual anonymous petition sent in 1807 from Moldavia). This trend was consolidated by the French cultural model partly adopted by the Russians, a growing mutual sympathy between the Principalities and France, increasingly obvious under the French July Monarchy, and, as early as the 1820s, the enrolment of young boyars in Parisian educational institutions (coupled with the 1830 opening of a French-language school in Bucharest, headed by Jean Alexandre Vaillant). The young generation eventually attempted to curb French borrowings, which it had come to see as endangering its nationalist aspirations.

== Statutory rules and nationalist opposition ==
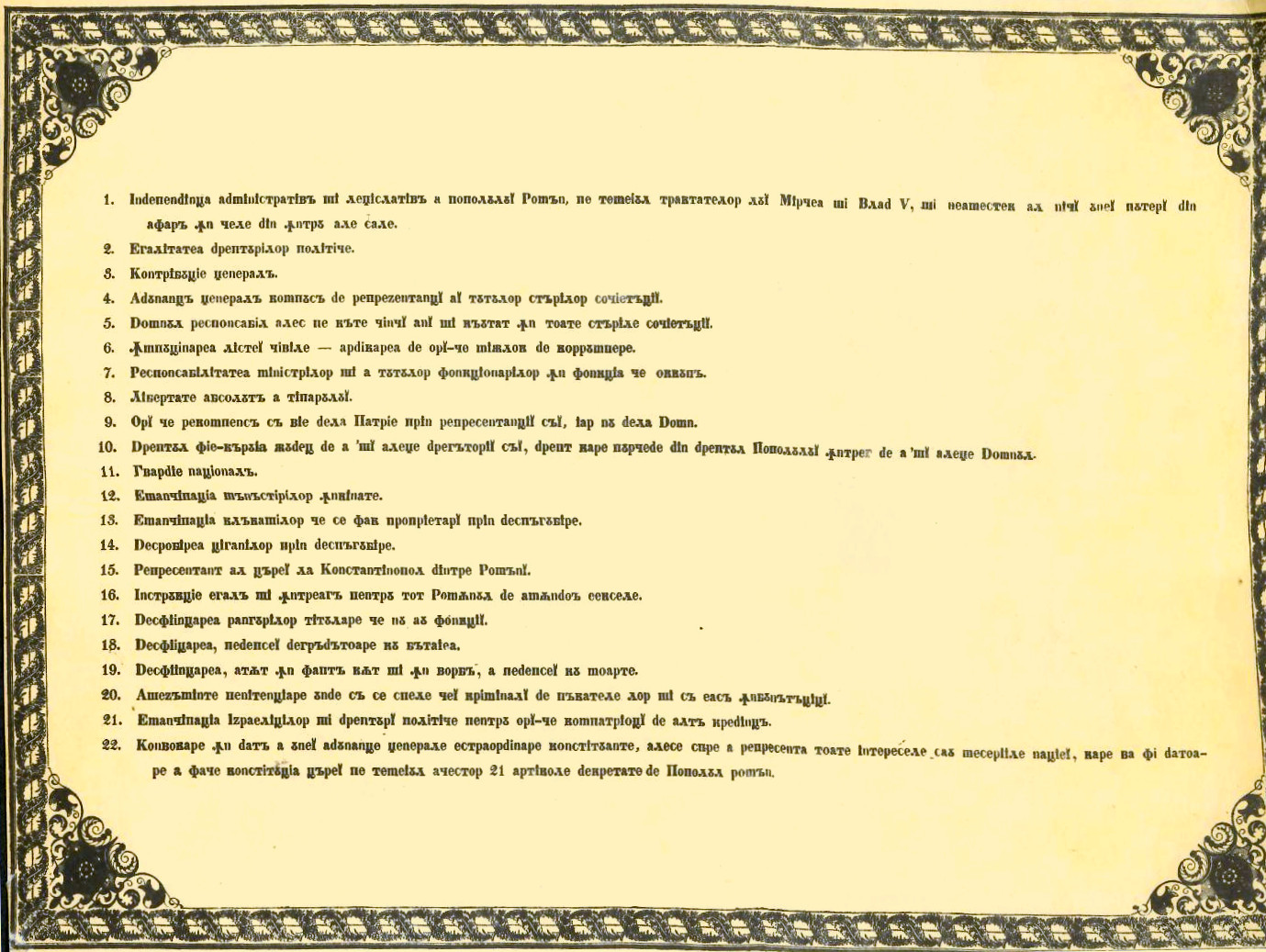
The Islaz Proclamation

In 1834, despite the founding documents' requirements, Russia and the Ottoman Empire agreed to appoint jointly the first two hospodars (instead of providing for their election), as a means to ensure both the monarchs' support for a moderate pace in reforms and their allegiance in front of conservative boyar opposition. The choices were Alexandru II Ghica (the stepbrother of the previous monarch, Grigore IV) as Prince of Wallachia and Mihail Sturdza (a distant cousin of Ioniță Sandu) as Prince of Moldavia. The two rulers (generally referred to as Domnii regulamentare—"statutory" or "regulated reigns"), closely observed by the Russian consuls and various Russian technical advisors, soon met a vocal and unified opposition in the Assemblies and elsewhere.

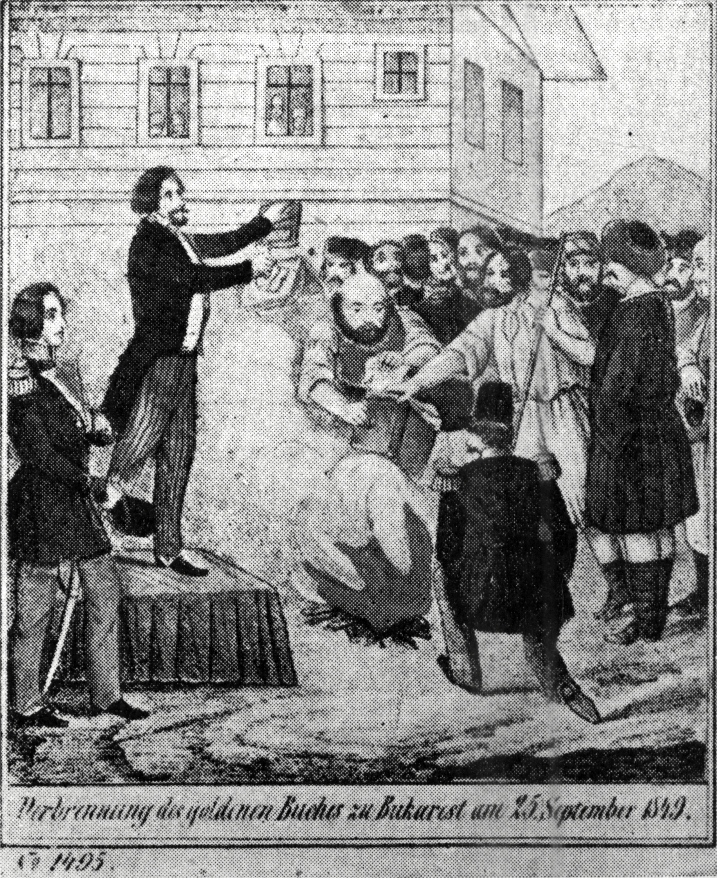
The burning of the Wallachian Regulament and of the register of boyar ranks during the 1848 revolution

Immediately after the confirmation of the Regulament, Russia had begun demanding that the two local Assemblies each vote an Additional Article (Articol adițional)—one preventing any modification of the texts without the common approval of the courts in Istanbul and Saint Petersburg. In Wallachia, the issue turned into scandal after the pressure for adoption mounted in 1834, and led to a four-year-long standstill, during which a nationalist group in the legislative body began working on its own project for a constitution, proclaiming the Russian protectorate and Ottoman suzerainty to be over, and self-determination with guarantees from all European Powers of the time. The radical leader of the movement, Ion Câmpineanu, maintained close contacts with Polish nobleman Adam Jerzy Czartoryski's Union of National Unity (as well as with other European nationalists Romantics); after the Additional Article passed due to Ghica's interference and despite boyar protests, Câmpineanu was forced to abandon his seat and take refuge in Central Europe (until being arrested and sent back by the Austrians to be imprisoned in Bucharest). From that point on, opposition to Ghica's rule took the form of Freemason and carbonari-inspired conspiracies, formed around young politicians such as Mitică Filipescu, Nicolae Bălcescu, Eftimie Murgu, Ion Ghica, Christian Tell, Dimitrie Macedonski, and Cezar Bolliac (all of whom held Câmpineanu's ideology in esteem)—in 1840, Filipescu and most of his group (who had tried in vain to profit from the Ottoman crisis engendered by Muhammad Ali's rebellion) were placed under arrest and imprisoned in various locations.

Noted abuses against the rule of law and the consequent threat of rebellion made the Ottoman Empire and Russia withdraw their support for Ghica in 1842, and his successor, Gheorghe Bibescu, reigned as the first and only prince to have been elected by any one of the two Assemblies. In Moldavia, the situation was less tense, as Sturdza was able to calm down and manipulate opposition to Russian rule while introducing further reforms.

In 1848, upon the outbreak of the European revolutions, liberalism consolidated itself into more overt opposition, helped along by contacts between Romanian students with the French movement. Nevertheless, the Moldavian revolution of late March 1848 was an abortive one, and led to the return of Russian troops on its soil. Wallachia's revolt was successful: after the Proclamation of Islaz on 21 June sketched a new legal framework and land reform with an end to all corvées (a program acclaimed by the crowds), the conspirators managed to topple Bibescu, who had by then dissolved the Assembly, without notable violence, and established a Provisoral Government in Bucharest.

The new executive, orchestrating the public burning of the Regulament in September, attempted to play Ottoman interests against Russian ones, trying to obtain backing from the Porte; the relative initial success was rendered void after Russian diplomats pressured Sultan Abd-ul-Mejid I to intervene in their place (and thus not risk losing yet more control over the region to a more determined Russian expedition). A Russian occupation over Wallachia soon joined the Ottoman one (begun on 18 September), and both lasted until April 1851; in 1849, the two powers signed the Convention of Balta Liman, which asserted the right of the Porte to nominate hospodars for seven-year terms.

== Crimean War ==
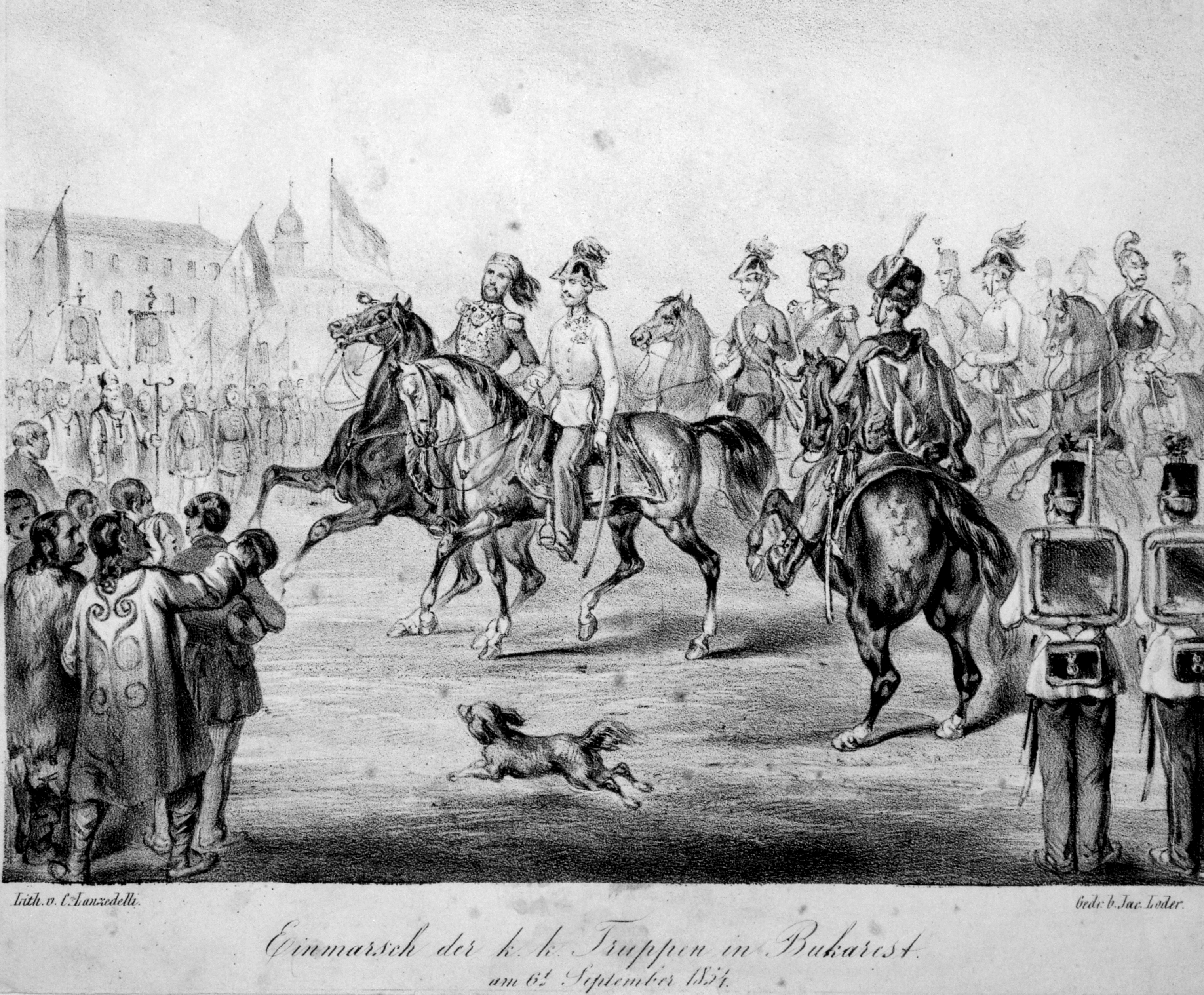
Austrian troops in Bucharest, 1854

The Crimean War again brought the two countries under Russian military administration, inaugurated in 1853. The hospodars of the period, Prince Grigore Alexandru Ghica in Moldavia and Prince Barbu Dimitrie Știrbei in Wallachia, were removed from their thrones, and the region was governed by the Russian general Aleksandr Ivanovich Budberg.

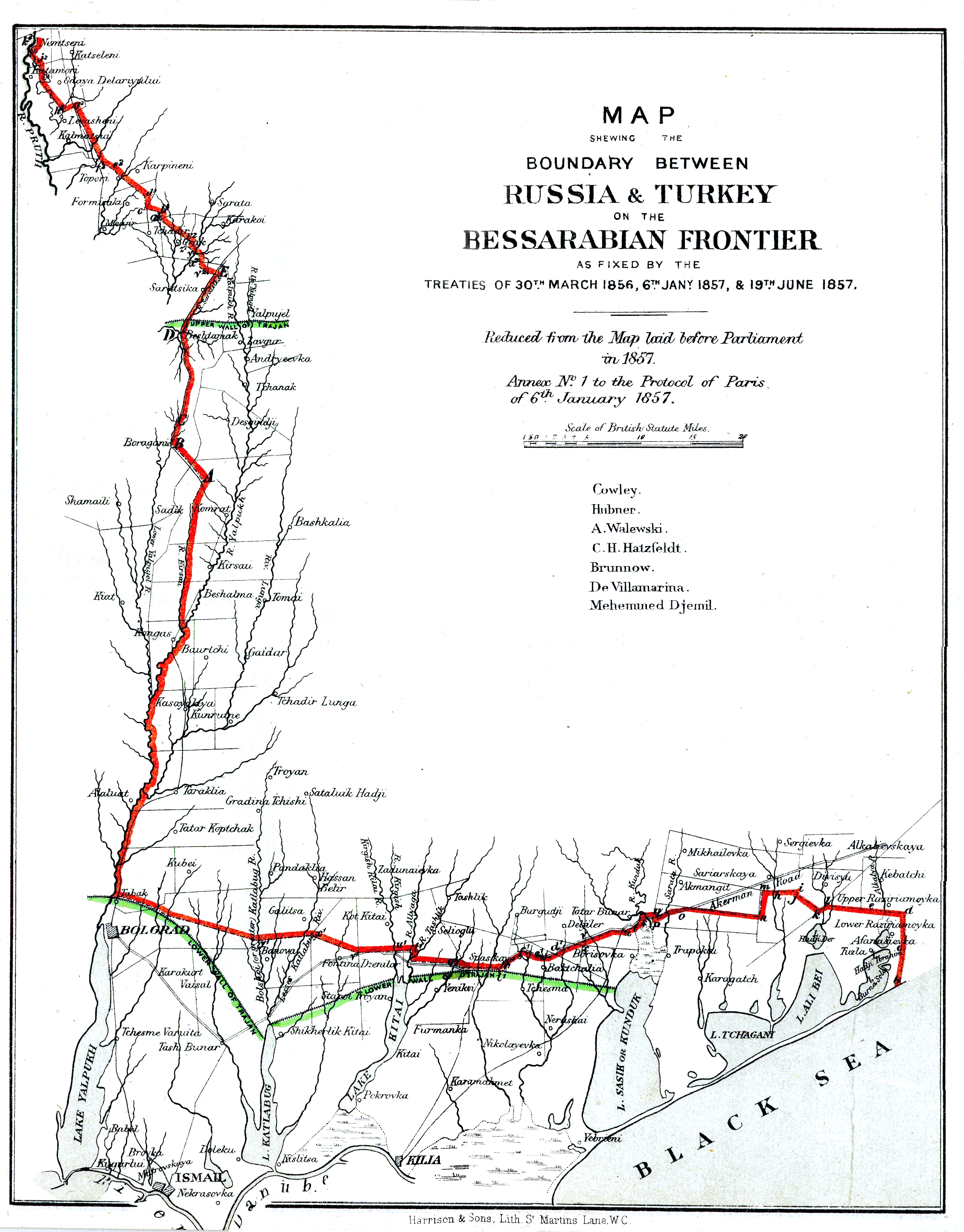
Russian–Moldavian border in 1856–1857

As the Balkans remained a secondary theatre of war, the two Principalities were taken over by a neutral Austrian administration in September 1854—part of a settlement between the Porte and Russia (the Austrians remained until 1857). Grigore Ghica and Știrbei were returned to the thrones in the same year, and completed the last series of reforms carried under the terms of the Regulament. The most far-reaching among these were the ones concerning Roma slavery. In Moldavia, Romas were liberated, without a period of transition, on 22 December 1855; the change was more gradual in Wallachia, where measures to curb trade had been taken earlier, and where the decision to ban the ownership of slaves was taken by Știrbei on 20 February 1856. Concerned by worsening boyar-peasant relations, Știrbei, who governed without an Assembly (and had instead appointed his own Divan), enacted measures to improve the situation in the countryside, and ultimately enforced contract-based work as the rule on estates (whereby peasants who were not indebted after five years in service could leave the land they were working on).

The war ended with the Treaty of Paris (30 March 1856), which placed the countries, still as Ottoman vassals, under the protectorate of all European Powers (the United Kingdom, the French Empire, the Kingdom of Piedmont-Sardinia, Prussia, Austria, and, never again completely, Russia). The protector states had to decide on a compromise formula for the projected union; the Ottomans demanded and obtained, in contradiction with the Regulament, the removal of both hospodars from their thrones, pending elections for the ad hoc Divans.

== See also ==
- History of Bucharest
- History of Romania
- Kingdom of Romania
- Military history of Imperial Russia
- Rise of nationalism under the Ottoman Empire
- Russian history, 1796–1855
