= Romanian revolution (disambiguation) =

The 1989 Romanian revolution was a revolt in Romania that resulted in the overthrow of the regime of Nicolae and Elena Ceaușescu.

Romanian revolution may also refer to:

- Wallachian uprising (1821)
- Wallachian Revolution of 1848
- Moldavian Revolution of 1848
- Transylvanian Revolution
- 1944 Romanian coup d'état
