= Southern Legion of the Commonwealth of Poland =

- Południowa Legia Rzeczypospolitej Polskiej
- Active: 1846
- Disbanded: 1848
- Allegiance: Moldavian revolutionaries Wallachian revolutionaries
- Type: Volunteer unit
- Campaigns: Moldavian Revolution of 1848; Wallachian Revolution of 1848

The Southern Legion of the Commonwealth of Poland (Note: Polish: Południowa Legia Rzeczypospolitej Polskiej) was a volunteer military unit of Polish expatriates, that existed from 1846 to 1848. It was formed in Bessarabia Governorate, Russian Empire, with the intention in supporting the Polish resistance movements during the Kraków uprising of 1846, the Greater Poland uprising of 1846, and later, the Greater Poland uprising of 1848. However the unit never reached those conflicts. Instead, it served in the Moldavian Revolution of 1848, and the Wallachian Revolution of 1848, fighting on the side of the revolutionaries, against the Russian Empire. It ceased to exist in 1848, with Russian forces tracking it down, and destroying it.
