= Moldavian Revolution of 1848 =

Unsuccessful Romanian liberal movement

- Part of the Revolutions of 1848 and the national awakening of Romania
Date	8 April – 7 July 1848
Location	Moldavia
Result	Counterrevolutionary victory: Revolution suppressed; Moldavia invaded by the Russian Empire; Mihail Sturdza deposed; Grigore Alexandru Ghica installed on the throne

Belligerents
Revolutionaries: Romanian liberals; Romanian nationalists	Moldavia; Russian Empire; Ottoman Empire

Commanders and leaders
Vasile Alecsandri; Mihail Kogălniceanu; Ion Ionescu	Mihail Sturdza; Grigore Alexandru Ghica (Russian Empire) Alexander Duhamel

The Moldavian Revolution of 1848 is the name used for the unsuccessful Romanian liberal and Romantic nationalist movement inspired by the Revolutions of 1848 in the principality of Moldavia. Initially seeking accommodation within the political framework defined by the Regulamentul Organic, it eventually rejected it as imposed by foreign powers (the Russian Empire) and called for more thorough political reforms. Led by a group of young intellectuals, the movement was mostly limited to petitioning and constitutional projects, unlike the successful uprising taking place later that year in neighbouring Wallachia, and it was quickly suppressed. This was despite the fact that the Moldavian revolutionaries were more moderate and willing to compromise in their demands for reforms than their Wallachian counterparts, as Moldavian political and social life continued to be dominated by a landed, conservative aristocracy, with the middle class still embryonic.

== Background ==
In Moldavia the boyars, from whose lower ranks the revolutionaries would be drawn, had come into sharp conflict with Prince Mihail Sturdza, objecting to his authoritarianism and failure to consult them, with some desiring the throne for themselves. They denounced him to Saint Petersburg and Istanbul, forming plots in the general assembly, but as they were internally divided and lacked popular support, Sturdza remained unconcerned at these flare-ups.

The peasantry was also aggrieved, and between 1846 and 1848 opposition to Sturdza intensified. The commercial and industrial associations of Iași (the capital city) in 1846 protested against the prince's plan to raise taxes again; in several rural areas small and middle-size landlords objected to paying additional taxes; and the summer of 1847 saw sharp contests in several județe by liberal boyars for seats in the general assembly. Peasants in Moldavia and Wallachia refused to perform labour services, with violence and flight abroad increasing in autumn 1847 and the next spring. Eager for change, intellectuals were roused by the February revolution in Paris, where a number of them were studying.

== Course of events ==
=== Iași ===
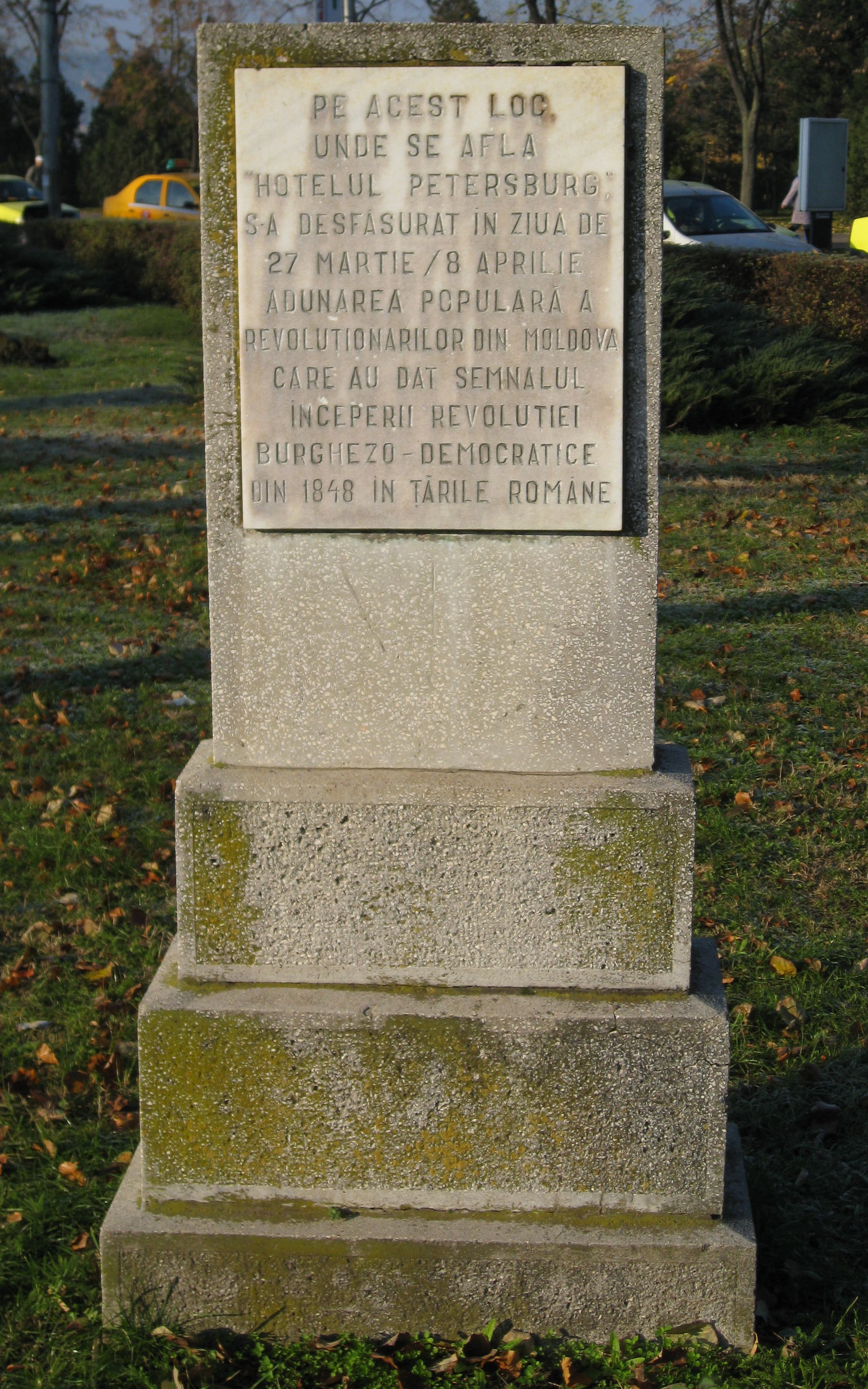
Communist-era plaque marking the site of the Petersburg Hotel, where an assembly on 8 April met and drew up a petition for Prince Mihail Sturdza.

Moldavian revolutionaries arrived in Iași after violence had broken out in Wallachia. On 8 April 1848, a few great boyars opposed to Sturdza, younger liberal boyars, and representatives of the middle class and other urban classes, perhaps a thousand in all, met in the Hotel Petersburg to decide on a course of action. This meeting was the culmination of several weeks of small private gatherings and several public manifestos denouncing despotism, all occasioned by news of the events in Paris, Vienna and Berlin. Moderates prevailed, persuading the gathering to support a petition to the prince setting forth all their grievances and proposing suitable reforms. They also agreed to dissolve their assembly and all other associations right after delivering the petition. Such caution seems principally to have been inspired by fear that the urban lower classes and peasantry would push the protest movement to extremes.

A committee chaired by the poet Vasile Alecsandri drew up Petiția-proclamație ("The Petition-Proclamation") addressed to the general population and to the prince. Their overall objective was to install a moderate liberal political regime and to stimulate economic development. Strict adherence to the law by officials as well as citizens was set down as a basic principle of government—unmistakably a reference to the corruption and arbitrariness of Sturdza's authoritarian regime. Rules were then outlined for electing a new, more representative assembly with increased powers, including the right to make proposals to the prince on all matters affecting the general welfare and to examine all government ordinances concerning public affairs and judicial administration before they were put into effect. They urged the creation of a national bank "to facilitate commerce" and the abolition of all tariffs "harmful to agriculture and commerce", also making a general plea for an improvement in peasants' relations with landlords and the state. While committed to reform and good institutions, they did not intend to overturn the country's existing political and social structures.

Sturdza received the petition-proclamation on 9 April and agreed to 33 of its 35 points, rejecting those that concerned dissolution of the general assembly and the formation of a national guard, also, it appears, objecting to the abolition of censorship. To his surprise, the movement leaders demanded acceptance of the entire petition. Sturdza withdrew to the army barracks and that evening took steps to crush the opposition. Several people were killed in brief fighting, and some 300 were arrested. Among those who fled, either to Transylvania or Bukovina, were Alecsandri and the young officer Alexandru Ioan Cuza, who would come to rule the United Principalities in the 1860s. Sturdza, now bent on permanently halting all dissent, made anyone even suspected of opposition subject to arrest, imposed strict censorship, and had students returning from France stopped at the border and interrogated before being allowed to proceed.

The Moldavian movement and its Wallachian counterpart alarmed Russia, which in late March had warned Sturdza and Prince Gheorghe Bibescu that armies would be sent across the Prut if changes were pondered in the Organic Statute system. The threat emboldened Sturdza to resist the liberals' demands. In April, after the Iați petitioners were scattered, Tsar Nicholas sent an aide, General Alexander Duhamel, to investigate the situation; in Iași he urged the prince to make a few modest concessions to defuse the situation, but the latter rejected any move toward "liberalism".

=== Cernăuți ===
Meeting in Cernăuți, Bukovina, Moldavian liberals formed Comitetul Revoluționar Moldovean (the Moldavian Revolutionary Committee) and commissioned Mihail Kogălniceanu to draw up a new statement of principles, Dorințele partidei naționale din Moldova ("The Wishes of the National Party in Moldavia"), published in August. More liberal than the 9 April petition, it called for an elected assembly with extensive powers, including the right to initiate legislation, and expanded the local autonomy of județe, cities and rural communes.

Kogălniceanu also drafted a constitution, Proiectul de Constituție, which rendered the legislature the dominant branch of government, allowing it to vote taxes, draw up the annual state budget, stimulate agriculture, industry and commerce, reform laws, elect the prince, and choose the metropolitan and bishops of the Orthodox Church. Kogălniceanu, a future Prime Minister of Romania, proposed that all orders of society be represented in the assembly, without calling for universal suffrage. Instead he proposed the creation of electoral college, giving the upper classes predominant power. Like most of his colleagues, he felt obliged to remain mindful of his era's social and political realities by recognizing the boyars' continued leading role and limiting the participation of peasants due to their lack of education and experience.

== Aftermath ==
On 7 July Russian troops entered Moldavia in order to prevent the establishment of a revolutionary government similar to that in Bucharest, but did not cross into Wallachia until 27 September. Military administration lasted until 1 May 1849, when the Convention of Balta Liman was signed with the Ottoman government and restored joint Russo-Turkish control over the Danubian Principalities.

The powers installed Grigore Alexandru Ghica as the new prince of Moldavia in 1849; he was close to the reformers and in 1848 supported their liberal programme. The selection was mainly due to Ottoman grand vizier Reshid pasha, who was impressed with Ghica's moderate liberalism, which he believed would promote a stable administration after the preceding year's turbulence. Remaining sympathetic to the liberal agenda, he not only allowed a number of revolutionaries to return home, but brought many of them into his administration, including Kogălniceanu, Alecsandri and Ion Ionescu de la Brad. He introduced important administrative reforms and promoted economic development and education, but eventually lost sympathy from the revolutionary leaders for failing to change the peasantry's status or broaden middle- and lower-class participation in political life.

== Bibliography ==
- Keith Hitchins, The Romanians, 1774–1866, Oxford University Press, USA, 1996.
