= Alexandru Ioan Cuza =

First ruler of the United Principalities of Moldavia and Wallachia (1820–1873)

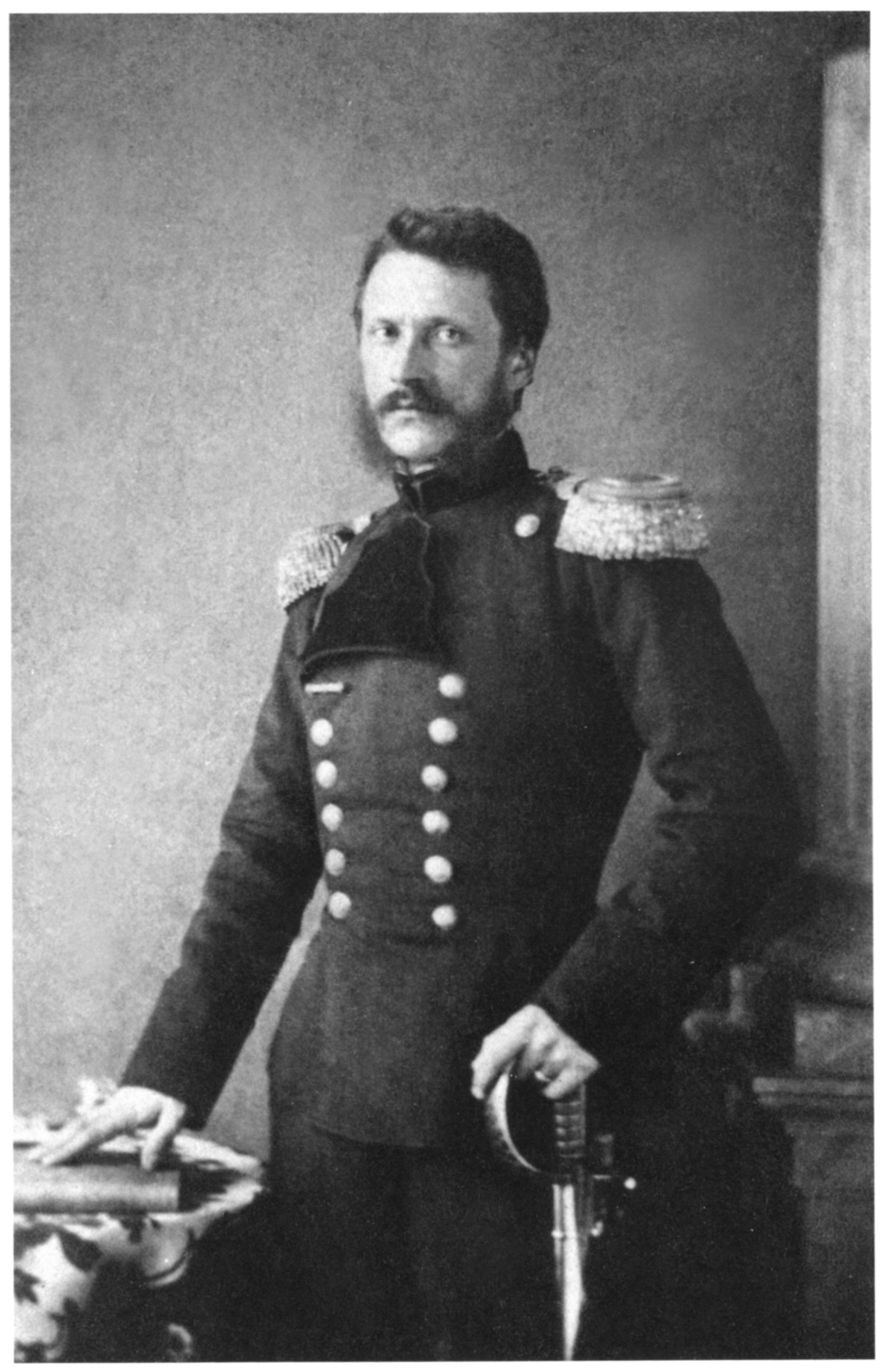
- Photograph by Carol Szathmari, 1859

Domnitor of Romania
- Reign: 5 February 1862 – 23 February 1866
- Predecessor: Himself as Prince of Moldavia and Wallachia
- Successor: Carol I
- Prime ministers: Full list

Prince of Moldavia
- Reign: 5 January 1859 – 5 February 1862
- Predecessor: Grigore Alexandru Ghica
- Successor: Himself as Domnitor of Romania

Prince of Wallachia
- Reign: 24 January 1859 – 5 February 1862
- Predecessor: Barbu Dimitrie Știrbei
- Successor: Himself as Domnitor of Romania
- Born: 20 March 1820; Bârlad, Ottoman Empire
- Died: 15 May 1873 (aged 53); Heidelberg, Baden, German Empire
- Burial: Three Holy Hierarchs Church, Iași
- Spouse: Elena Rosetti (m. 1844)
- Issue: Sașa Cuza; Dimitrie Cuza
- House: Cuza
- Father: Ioan Cuza
- Mother: Sultana Cozadini
- Religion: Eastern Orthodoxy

Alexandru Ioan Cuza (Romanian: [alekˈsandru iˈo̯aŋ ˈkuza], or Alexandru Ioan I, also Anglicised as Alexander John Cuza; 20 March [O.S. 8 March] 1820 – 15 May 1873) was the first domnitor (prince) of the Romanian Principalities through his double election as Prince of Moldavia on 5 January 1859 and Prince of Wallachia on 24 January 1859, which resulted in the unification of the two states. He was a prominent figure of the Moldavian Revolution of 1848. Following his double election, he initiated a series of liberal and progressive reforms that contributed to the modernization of Romanian society and of state structures.

As ruler of the Romanian Principalities, he supported a political and diplomatic activity for the recognition of the union of Moldavia and Wallachia by the suzerain Ottoman Empire and achieved constitutional and administrative unity between Moldavia and Wallachia in 1862, when the Romanian Principalities officially adopted the name Romanian United Principalities with a single capital at Bucharest, a single national assembly and a single government.

Cuza's reform policies alienated a large coalition of conservatives and radical liberals, for the most part landowners and business owners. On 22 February 1866, he was forced to abdicate and leave the country. Today, he is often considered one of the founders of the modern Romanian state and a national hero of Romania.

== Early life ==
Coat of arms of the Cuza family

Born in Bârlad, Cuza belonged to the traditional boyar class in Moldavia, the son of Ispravnic Ioan Cuza (who was also a landowner in Fălciu County) and his wife, Sultana (or Soltana), a member of the Cozadini family of Phanariote and Genovese origins. Alexander received an urbane European education in Iași, Pavia, Bologna, and Athens; after a brief period of military service, he was also educated in Paris from 1837 to 1840. He became an officer in the Moldavian Army and rose to the rank of colonel. Alexandru married Princess Elena Rosetti in 1844.

During the Revolutions of 1848, Moldavia and Wallachia fell into revolt. The Moldavian unrest was quickly suppressed, but in Wallachia the revolutionaries took power and governed during the summer. Young Cuza played a prominent enough part to establish his liberal credentials. He was shipped to Vienna as a prisoner, where he made his escape with British support.

Returning during the reign of Prince Grigore Alexandru Ghica, he became Moldavia's minister of war in 1858; he also represented Galați in the ad hoc Divan at Iași. Cuza was acting freely under the guarantees of the European Powers in the eve of the Crimean War for recognition of a Prince of Moldavia. Cuza was a prominent speaker in the debates and strongly advocated the union of Moldavia and Wallachia. In default of a foreign prince, he was nominated as a candidate in both principalities by the pro-unionist Partida Națională (profiting of an ambiguity in the text of the Treaty of Paris). Cuza was finally elected as Prince of Moldavia on 17 January 1859 (5 January Julian) and, after "street pressure" changed the vote in Bucharest, also Prince of Wallachia, on 5 February 1859 (24 January Julian), effectively uniting both principalities. He received the firman from the Sultan on 2 December 1861 during a visit to Istanbul. He was a recipient of the Order of Medjidie, Order of Osmanieh, Order of Saints Maurice and Lazarus, and Order of the Redeemer.

Although he and his wife Elena Rosetti had no children, she raised as her own children his two sons by his mistress Elena Maria Catargiu-Obrenović: Alexandru Al. Ioan Cuza (1864–1890), and Dimitrie Cuza (1865–1888 suicide).

== Reign ==
=== Diplomatic efforts ===
Thus Cuza achieved a de facto union of the two principalities. The Powers backtracked, with Napoleon III of France remaining supportive, while the Austrian ministry withheld approval of such a union at the Congress of Paris (18 October 1858); partly as a consequence, Cuza's authority was not recognized by his nominal suzerain, Abdülaziz, the Sultan of the Ottoman Empire, until 23 December 1861. Even then, the union was only accepted for the duration of Cuza's rule.

The union was formally declared three years later, on 5 February 1862, (24 January Julian), the new country bearing the name of Romania, with Bucharest as its capital city.

Cuza invested his diplomatic actions in gaining further concessions from the Powers: the sultan's assent to a single unified parliament and cabinet for Cuza's lifetime, in recognition of the complexity of the task. Thus, he was regarded as the political embodiment of a unified Romania.

=== Reforms ===
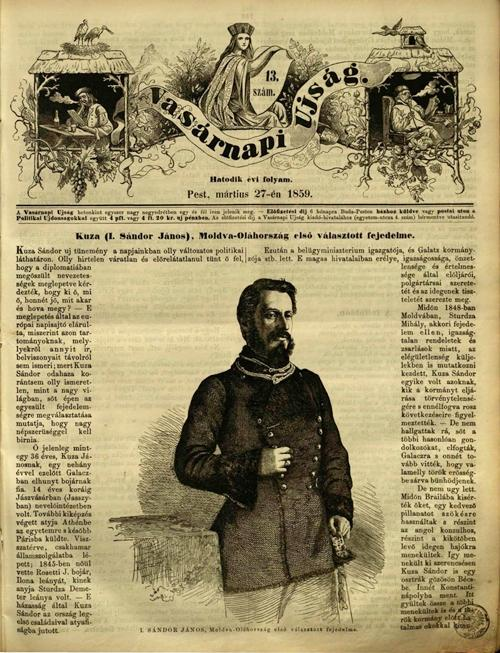
Hungarian newspaper Vasárnapi Ujság commented "with sympathy and respect" (Carol C. Koka) Cuza's double election in Moldavia and Wallachia

Assisted by his councilor Mihail Kogălniceanu, an intellectual leader of the 1848 revolution, Cuza initiated a series of reforms that contributed to the modernization of Romanian society and of state structures.

His first measure addressed a need for increasing the land resources and revenues available to the state, by nationalizing monastic estates in 1863. Probably more than a quarter of Romania's farmland was controlled by untaxed Eastern Orthodox "Dedicated monasteries", which supported Greek and other foreign monks in shrines such as Mount Athos and Jerusalem, presenting a substantial drain on state revenues. Cuza got his parliament's backing to expropriate these lands.

During the secularization of the Antiochian Metochion in Bucharest, Cuza exiled its proistamenos the Metropolitan Ioannikios of Palmyra and arrested its hegumen Seraphim, later Metropolitan of Irenopolis in Isauria. He offered compensation to the Greek Orthodox Church, but Sophronius III, the Patriarch of Constantinople, refused to negotiate; after several years, the Romanian government withdrew its offer and no compensation was ever paid. State revenues thereby increased without adding any domestic tax burden. The land reform, liberating peasants from the last corvées, freeing their movements and redistributing some land (1864), was less successful. In attempting to create a solid support base among the peasants, Cuza soon found himself in conflict with the group of Conservatives. A liberal bill granting peasants title to the land they worked was defeated. Then the Conservatives responded with a bill that ended all peasant dues and responsibilities, but gave landlords title to all the land. Cuza vetoed it, then held a plebiscite to alter the Paris Convention (the virtual constitution), in the manner of Napoleon III.

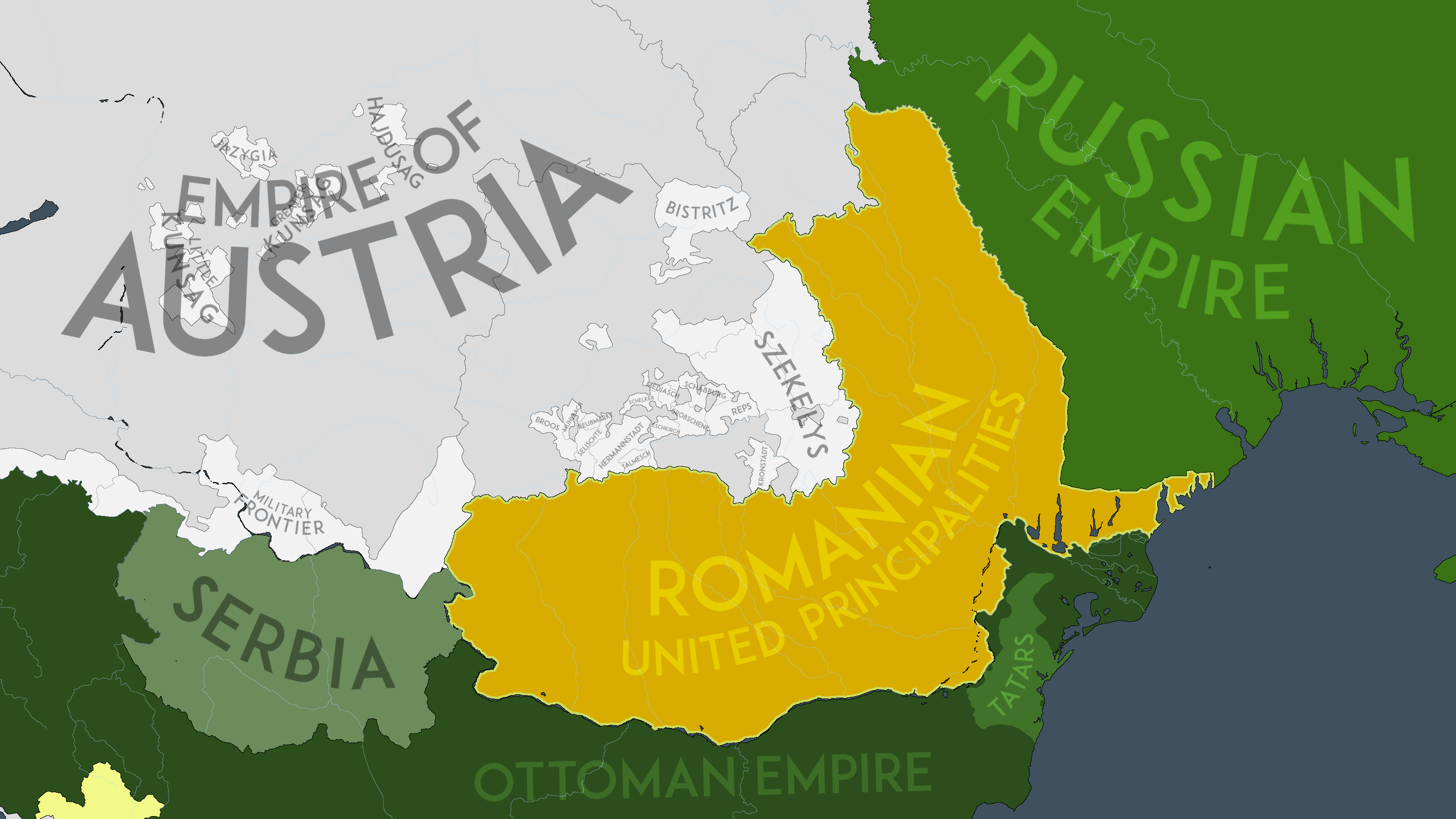
Romania in 1862 AD, after Alexandru Ioan Cuza merged the Principalities of Wallachia and Moldavia into one unitary state.

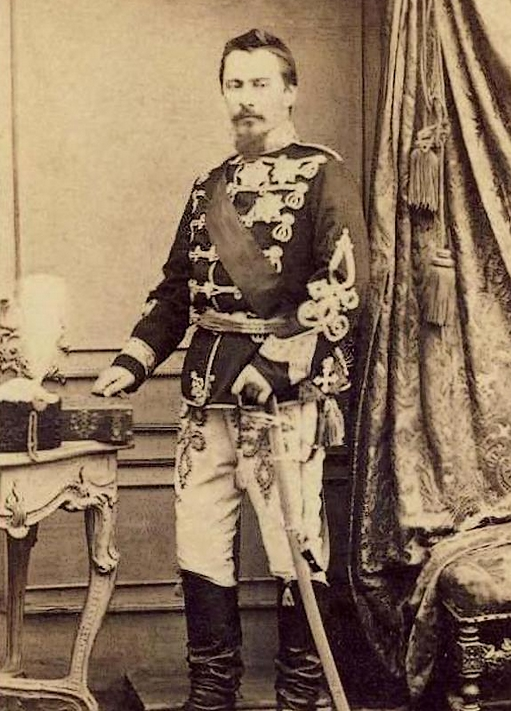
Alexandru Ioan Cuza official portrait

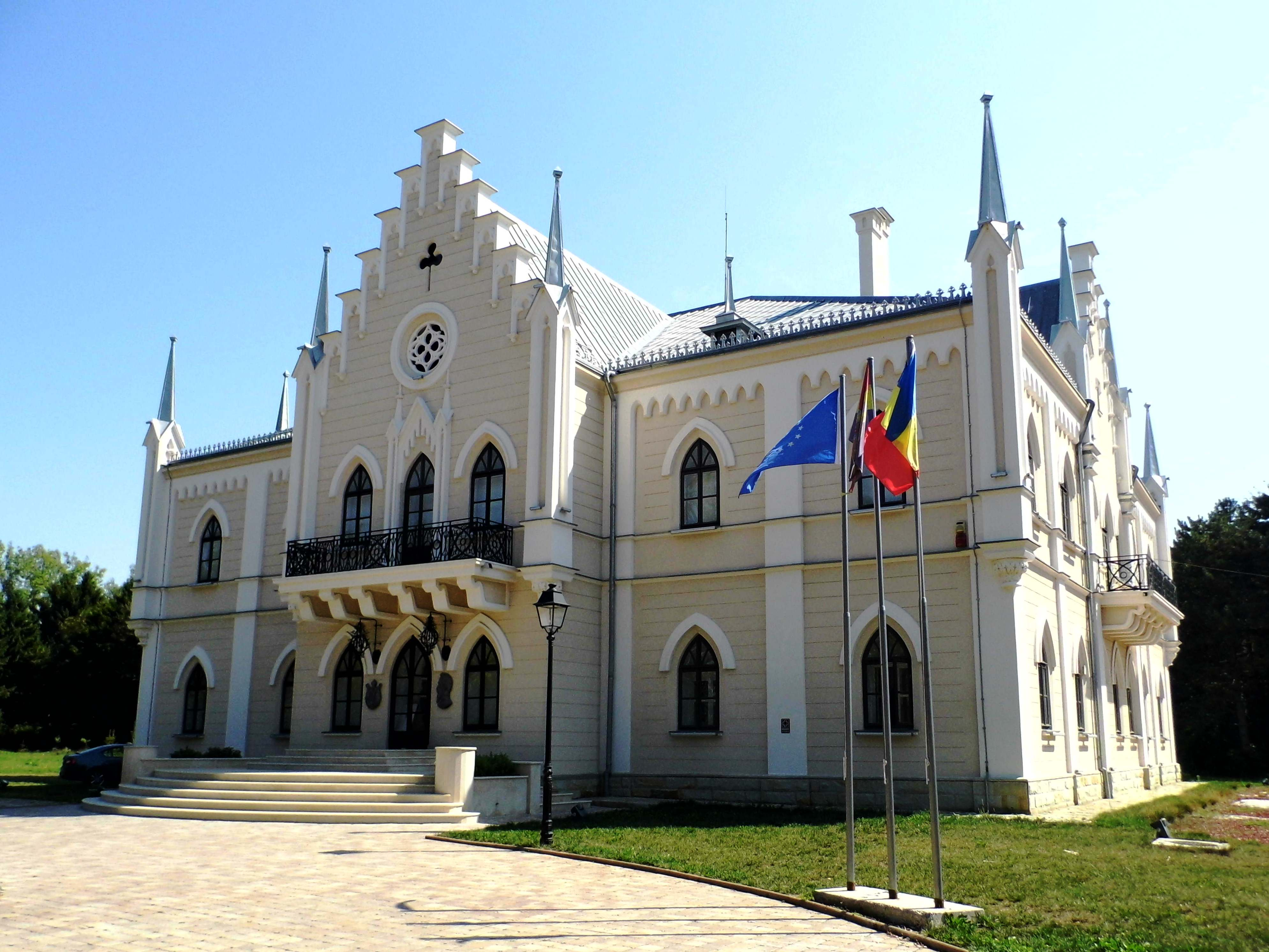
The Al.I. Cuza family residence in Ruginoasa

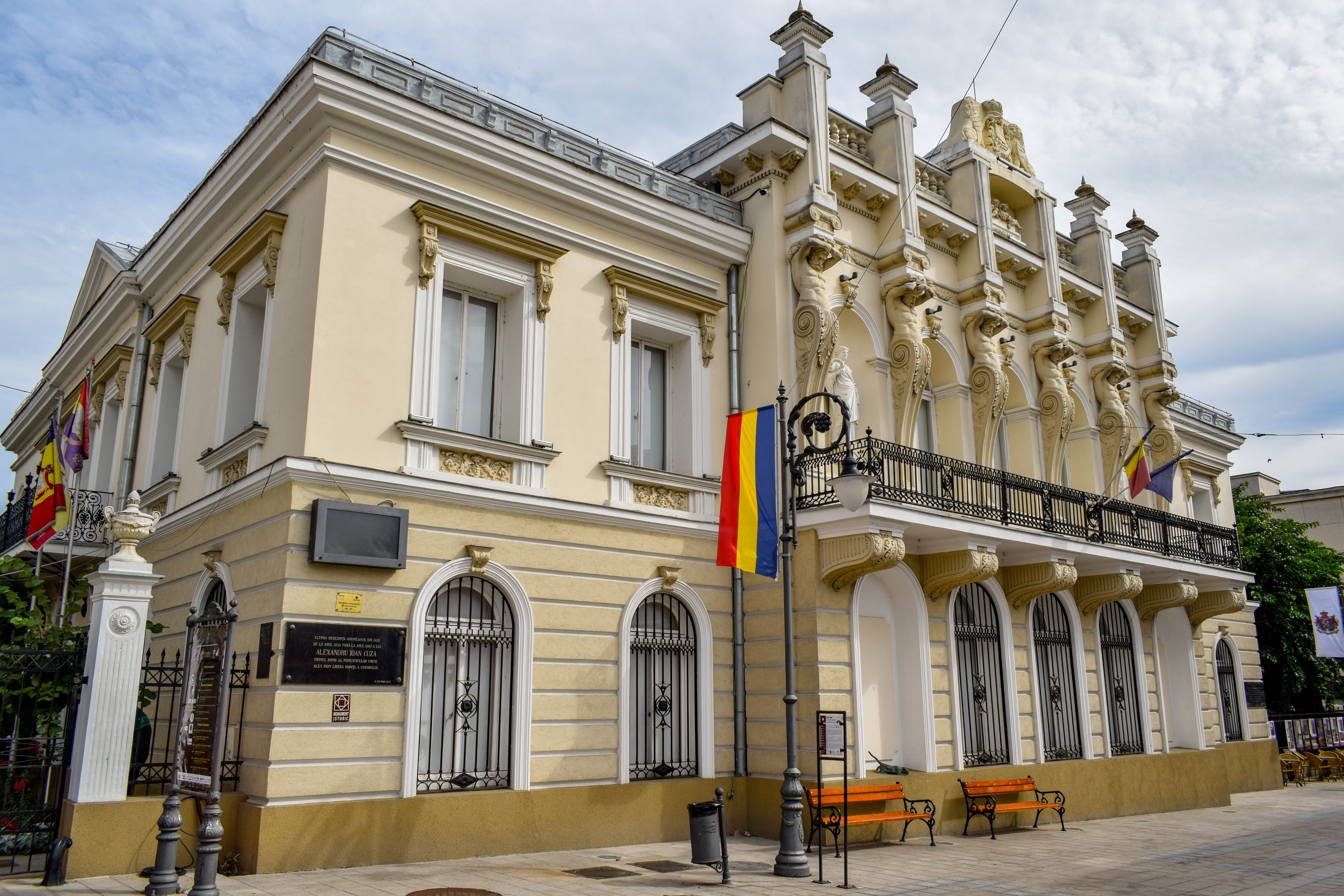
The residence of Prince Cuza in Iași, one of the two capitals of the United Principalities between 1859 and 1862

His plan to establish universal manhood suffrage, together with the power of the Domnitor to rule by decree, passed by a vote of 682,621 to 1,307. This was an imperfect solution, still catering to the wealthy, and would be added onto with a constitution revision in 1866 after his abdication. He consequently governed the country under the provisions of Statutul dezvoltător al Convenției de la Paris ("Statute expanding the Paris Convention"), an organic law adopted on 15 July 1864. With his new plenary powers, Cuza then promulgated the Agrarian Law of 1863. Peasants received title to the land they worked, while landlords retained ownership of one third. Where there was not enough land available to create workable farms under this formula, state lands (from the confiscated monasteries) would be used to give the landowners compensation.

Despite the attempts by Lascăr Catargiu's cabinet to force a transition in which some corvées were to be maintained, Cuza's reform marked the disappearance of the boyar class as a privileged group, and led to a channeling of energies into capitalism and industrialization; at the same time, however, land distributed was still below necessities, and the problem became stringent over the following decades – as peasants reduced to destitution sold off their land or found that it was insufficient for the needs of their growing families.

Cuza's reforms also included the adoption of the Criminal Code and the Civil Code based on the Napoleonic Code (1864), a Law on Education, establishing tuition-free, compulsory public education for primary schools (1864; the system, nonetheless, suffered from drastic shortages in allocated funds; illiteracy was eradicated about 100 years later, during the communist regime). He founded the University of Iași (1860) and the University of Bucharest (1864), and helped develop a modern, European-style Romanian Army, under a working relationship with France. He is the founder of the Romanian Naval Forces.

== Downfall and exile ==
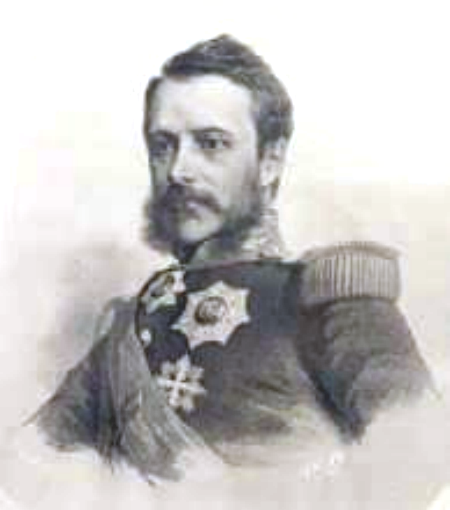
Cuza in the 1860s; portrait by August Strixner

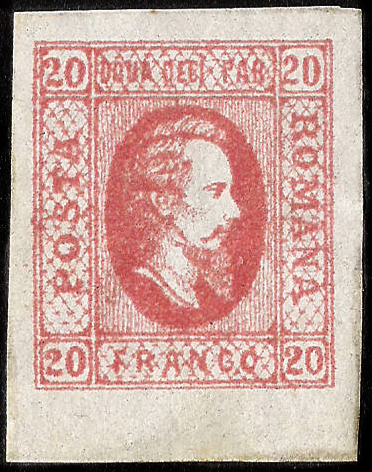
1865 stamp

Cuza failed in his effort to create an alliance of prosperous peasants and a strong liberal prince, ruling as a benevolent authoritarian in the style of Napoleon III. Having to rely on a decreasing group of hand-picked bureaucrats, Cuza began facing a mounting opposition after his land reform bill, with liberal landowners voicing concerns over his ability to represent their interests. Along with financial distress, there was an awkward scandal that revolved around his mistress, Maria Catargiu-Obrenović, and popular discontent culminated in a coup d'état. Cuza was forced to abdicate by the so-called "monstrous coalition" of Conservatives and Liberals. At four o'clock on the morning of 11 February 1866, a group of military conspirators broke into the palace, and compelled the prince to sign his abdication. On the following day they conducted him safely across the border.

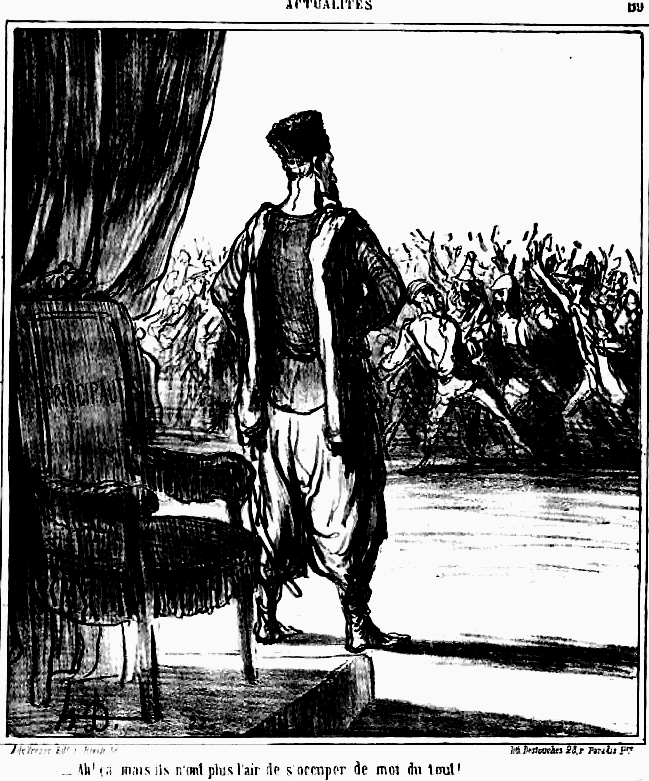
A French perspective on the situation after Cuza's toppling, caricature by Honoré Daumier in Le Charivari (May 5, 1866). A character symbolising the Danubian Principalities, looking on as the Foreign Powers charged with overseeing him quarrel: "Oh, my! It looks as if they are no longer taking care of me at all!"

His successor, Prince Karl of Hohenzollern-Sigmaringen, was proclaimed Domnitor as Carol I of Romania on 20 April 1866. The election of a foreign prince with ties to an important princely house, legitimizing Romanian independence (which Carol came to do after the Russo-Turkish War of 1877–1878), had been one of the liberal aims in the revolution of 1848.

Despite the participation of Ion Brătianu and other future leaders of the Liberal Party in the overthrow of Cuza, he remained a hero to the radical and republican wing, who, as Francophiles, had an additional reason to oppose a Prussian monarch. There were anti-Carol riots in Bucharest during the Franco-Prussian War (see History of Bucharest) and a coup attempt known as the Republic of Ploiești in August 1870. The conflict was eventually resolved by a compromise between Brătianu and Carol, with the appointment of a prolonged and influential Liberal cabinet.

Cuza spent the remainder of his life in exile, chiefly in Paris, Vienna, and Wiesbaden, accompanied by his wife and his two sons. He died in Heidelberg on 15 May 1873. His remains were buried in his residence in Ruginoasa, but were moved to the Trei Ierarhi Cathedral in Iași after World War II.

== Honours ==
=== Foreign orders and decorations ===
- Ottoman Empire: Order of the Medjidie, September 1860
- Sardinia: Order of Saints Maurice and Lazarus, October 1860
- Greece: Order of the Redeemer, 1862
- Ottoman Empire: Order of Osmanieh, 1864

Alexandru Ioan Cuza House of Cuza Born: 20 March 1820 Died: 15 May 1873
Regnal titles
Preceded by Title created	Domnitor of Romania; 5 February 1862 – 22 February 1866	Succeeded by Carol I
Preceded by Grigore Alexandru Ghica	Prince of Moldavia; 24 January 1859 – 5 February 1862	Succeeded by Title abandoned
Preceded by Barbu Știrbei	Prince of Wallachia; 24 January 1859 – 5 February 1862	Succeeded by Title abandoned
