= Danubian Principalities =

Geopolitical term for the states of Moldavia and Wallachia in the period of 1774–1858

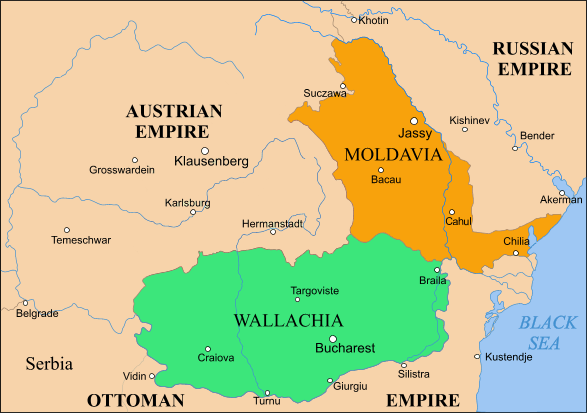
Moldavia and Wallachia in 1856–1859.

The Danubian Principalities (German: Donaufürstentümer, Russian: Дунайские княжества, Romanian: Principatele Dunărene) was a geopolitical term used for the Ottoman vassal principalities of Moldavia and Wallachia in the period of 1774–1858, a time when the territories were a battleground between the Ottoman Empire, Habsburg Monarchy, and Russian Empire. While Russia returned Moldavia and Wallachia to the Ottoman Empire with the Treaty of Küçük Kaynarca (1774), it retained protectorship over the two and also of the Orthodox subjects in all of the Ottoman Empire. This made the two principalities have the status of dual authority, under Ottoman suzerainty but with Russian protection. The Russo-Turkish War (1828–1829) ended with the Russian occupation of the two principalities. The negotiations of the Great Powers in the aftermath of Russian defeat resulted in the unification of Moldavia and Wallachia in 1859.

== Background ==
Moldavia and Wallachia came under Ottoman rule in the 16th century but retained a semi-autonomous status. Stricter foreign affairs came to be dictated by the Sublime Porte in the period of the Phanariotes (1711–1821), following conflicts between the Ottoman Empire, Habsburg Monarchy, and Russian Empire (the Great Turkish War). The Phanariotes was an aristocratic Greek Orthodox community of Constantinople that came to prominence in the mid-17th century, and from whom the gospodar (lord) of Moldavia and Wallachia, respectively, was chosen by the Porte to govern.

The principalities were briefly occupied by Russia in 1739 and 1769. In the 18th century the two principalities were a battleground in a succession of wars between the Ottomans on one side and Russia or the Habsburg monarchy on the other. Catherine the Great returned Wallachia, Moldavia and Bessarabia to the Ottomans in 1774, with the Treaty of Küçük Kaynarca, which however importantly made Moldavia and Wallachia a Russian protectorate, and affirmed Russia's role as the "guardian" of the Orthodox Christian subjects in the Ottoman Empire. Moldavia and Wallachia were put under dual authority, with Ottoman suzerainty and Russian protectorate. The boyars of Moldavia and Wallachia had requested Russian protectorate in order to consolidate autonomy.

== History ==
=== Dual authority and wars ===
In 1787 Russia marched into the principalities with the aim to install Grigory Potemkin as "Prince of Dacia", but the war ended in 1792, reaffirming existing Ottoman-Russian treaties. In 1802 the Porte agreed to fix the Phanariot tenure to seven years and their dethroning was made impossible without Russian approval. In 1806 the two principalities were reoccupied by Russia, put under the governorship of general Kutuzov, until 1812 when the Treaty of Bucharest (1812) saw their return under Ottoman suzerainty, a deal made to secure the southern Russian flank during Napoleon's invasion. Russia still annexed Bessarabia and retained the right to interfere in the internal affairs of the two principalities. In 1812 Napoleon had objected to Russian control of Moldavia and Wallachia as they were seen as a threat to French influence in the Near East.

=== Uprising and national awakening ===
Moldavia and Wallachia became involved in the cause of Greek independence. Backed by Phanariotes, the Filiki Eteria maneuvered in Moldavia during the anti-Phanariote and pro-Eterian 1821 Wallachian uprising. Wallachian initiative was toppled by an Eterian administration which itself retreated in the face of Ottoman invasion.

Although these events brought about the disestablishment of Phanariote rules by the Porte itself, this was of little consequence in itself, as a new Russo-Turkish War brought a period of Russian occupation under formal Ottoman supervision, extended between 1829 and the Crimean War (Treaty of Adrianople). A parallel Russian military administration was put in place, while the two principalities were given the first common governing document (the Organic Statute): although never fully implemented, it confirmed a modernizing government, created a new legal framework that reformed public administration, and deeply influenced political life in the following decades. The Russian pressures for changes in the text were perceived by Wallachians and Moldavians as a drive to remove the territories from Ottoman rule and annex them to a much more centralised and absolutist empire. This coincided with the period of national awakening and the Revolutions of 1848 - the rejection of Russian tutelage during the Moldavian attempt and the Wallachian revolutionary period were viewed with a degree of sympathy by the Porte, but calls by Russia ultimately led to a common occupation in the years following the rebellion's crushing.

=== Unification ===
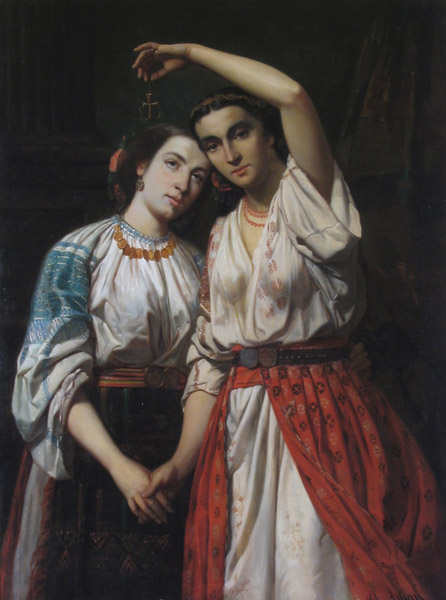
Theodor Aman's painting The Union of the Principalities

The aftermath of Russian defeat in 1856 (the Treaty of Paris) brought forth a period of common tutelage of the Ottomans and a Congress of Great Powers (the United Kingdom of Great Britain and Ireland, the French Empire, the Austrian Empire, the Kingdom of Prussia, the Kingdom of Piedmont-Sardinia, and, albeit never again fully, the Russian Empire). While the Moldavia-Wallachia unionist cause, which had come to dominate political demands, was viewed with sympathy by the French, Russians, Prussians, and Sardinians, it was rejected by the Austrian Empire, and viewed with suspicion by Great Britain and the Ottomans. The leading unionist figures were alumni of Western universities and the Transylvanian school. Negotiations amounted to an agreement over a minimal and formal union - however, elections for the ad hoc divans of 1859 profited from an ambiguity in the text of the final agreement (specifying two thrones, but not preventing the same person from occupying both) and made possible the rule of Alexander Ioan Cuza as Domnitor of the "United Principalities of Moldavia and Wallachia".

== Aftermath and legacy ==
The unification of Moldavia and Wallachia was cemented by Alexander Ioan Cuza's unsanctioned interventions in the text of previous organic laws, as well as by the circumstances of his deposition in 1866, when the rapid election of Carol of Hohenzollern-Sigmaringen, who had the backing of an increasingly important Prussia, and the Austro-Prussian War made measures taken against the union impossible. In 1878, after the Romanian War of Independence, Romania shook off formal Ottoman rule, but clashed with its Russian ally over the Russian request for the Bujak (southern Bessarabia) - ultimately, Romania was awarded Northern Dobruja in exchange for Southern Bessarabia. A Kingdom of Romania emerged in 1881.

== See also ==
- List of rulers of Moldavia
- List of rulers of Wallachia

== Annotations ==
1. The term Donaufürstentümer was coined in the Habsburg monarchy after the 1774 treaty in order to designate that area on the lower Danube with a common geopolitical situation. By extension, the term may include Serbia, however, current historiography uses it strictly for Moldavia and Wallachia.

== Sources ==
- Glenny, Misha (2000). The Balkans: Nationalism, War, and the Great Powers, 1804-1999. Viking. pp. 15–. ISBN 978-0-670-85338-0.
- Iordachi, Constantin (2013-07-15). "Moldavia and Wallachia's "Greek Question"". Entangled Histories of the Balkans - Volume One: National Ideologies and Language Policies. BRILL. ISBN 978-90-04-25076-5.
