= Keith Hitchins =

American historian member of the Romanian Academy

- Born: April 2, 1931; Schenectady, New York, United States
- Died: November 1, 2020 (aged 89); Urbana, Illinois, United States
- Awards: National Order of Merit (Romania)

Academic background
- Education: Union College; Harvard University
- Thesis: (1964)
- Doctoral advisor: Robert Lee Wolff

Academic work
- Discipline: History, mostly Romanian history
- Institutions: Wake Forest University; Rice University; University of Illinois Urbana-Champaign
- Website: history.illinois.edu/directory/profile/khitchin

Keith Arnold Hitchins (April 2, 1931 – November 1, 2020) was an American historian and a professor of Eastern European history at the University of Illinois Urbana-Champaign, specializing in Romania and its history.

== Early life and education ==
He was born in Schenectady, New York. After graduating from Union College, he went to Harvard University, earning a Ph.D. in history in 1964 under the direction of Robert Lee Wolff. After teaching for seven years at Wake Forest University and then for a short period at Rice University, he joined the faculty at the University of Illinois Urbana-Champaign, where he spent the rest of his academic career.

== Career ==
Hitchins wrote or edited more than 20 books, most related to Romania. An honorary member of the Romanian Academy since 1991, he was awarded the National Order of Merit by Romanian President Klaus Iohannis.

== Death ==
Hitchins died on November 1, 2020, at age 89, in the Carle Foundation Hospital in Urbana, Illinois. After his death, Romanian Minister of Foreign Affairs Bogdan Aurescu wrote on Twitter:

We pay homage to professor Keith Hitchins, an American voice of immeasurable value to the academic world. Having an authentic interest and expertise in the history of Romania, he was an honorary member of the Romanian Academy. The death of professor Hitchins is a loss to everyone who knew him and knew his work.

— Bogdan Aurescu, 2020.

== Publications ==
- Hitchins, Keith (December 1964). "Samuel Clain and the Rumanian Enlightenment in Transylvania". Slavic Review. 23 (4): 660–675. doi:10.2307/2492203. JSTOR 2492203. S2CID 155577846.
- The Rumanian national movement in Transylvania, 1780–1849. Cambridge, MA: Harvard University Press. 1969. ISBN 0-19-626566-5. OCLC 52045.
- Orthodoxy and nationality: Andreiu Șaguna and the Rumanians of Transylvania, 1846–1873. Cambridge, MA: Harvard University Press. 1977. ISBN 0-674-64491-3. OCLC 2523561.
- Rumania, 1866–1947. Oxford: Clarendon Press. 1994. ISBN 978-0-19-158615-6. OCLC 44961723.
- The Romanians, 1774–1866. Oxford: Clarendon Press. 1996. ISBN 0-19-820591-0. OCLC 33009873.
- Hitchins, Keith (2014). A concise history of Romania. Cambridge, UK: Cambridge University Press. doi:10.1017/CBO9781139033954. ISBN 978-0-521-87238-6. OCLC 858081302.

== See also ==
- List of members of the Romanian Academy
