= Domnitor =

Official title of the ruler of Romania between 1862 and 1881

Principe Domnitor of the United Principalities
- Princely Coat of arms

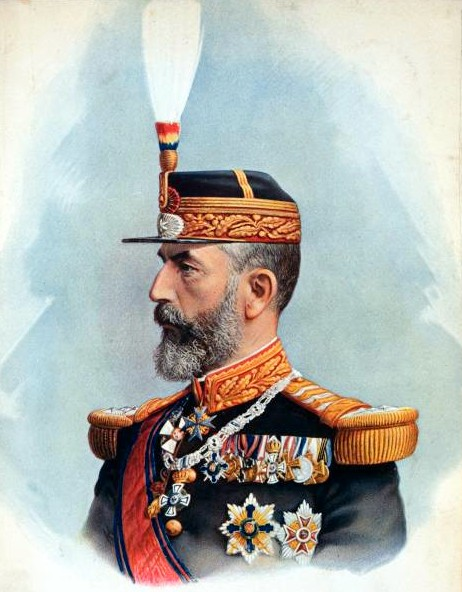
- Carol I

Details
- Style: His Royal Highness
- First monarch: Alexander John I
- Last monarch: Carol I
- Formed: 5 February 1862
- Abolished: 15 March 1881
- Appointer: Hereditary

Prince Domnitor, in full Principe Domnitor (Romanian pl. Principi Domnitori) was the official title of the ruler of Romania between 1862 and 1881. It was usually translated as "prince regnant" in English and most other languages, and less often as "grand duke". "Domnitor" is an adjective derived from the Romanian word "domn" (lord or ruler) and, in turn, from the Latin "Dominus". The title Domn had been in use since the Middle Ages and it is also the Romanian equivalent to the Slavic Hospodar. Moldavian and Wallachian rulers had used this term for their title of authority as the head of state, while "voievod" represented the military rank as the head of the army.

The title acquired an officially recognized meaning after Moldavia and Wallachia united to form the Romanian United Principalities under Alexander John I, who had become the ruler of both states since 1859. Alexander John abdicated in 1866 and was succeeded by Carol I, who promulgated the first constitution who officially used the name Romania for the country. He held the title until 1881. When Romania was proclaimed a kingdom in March 1881, Carol became its first king.

== Domnitori of the United Principalities (1862–1881) ==
Name	Lifespan	Reign start	Reign end	Notes	Family	Image
Alexandru Ioan Cuza	20 March 1820–15 May 1873 (aged 53)	5 February 1862	22 February 1866	—	Cuza	Alexander I of Romania
Carol I	20 April 1839–10 October 1914 (aged 75)	20 April 1866	15 March 1881	Became King of the Romanians	Hohenzollern-Sigmaringen	Carol I of Romania

== Timeline of the lifespans of Domnitors ==
This is a graphical lifespan timeline of Domnitors of Romania. The domnitors are listed in order of office.

== See also ==
- King of the Romanians
- List of rulers of Moldavia
- List of rulers of Wallachia
- List of heads of state of Romania
