= Kogălniceanu =

Kogălniceanu or Cogălniceanu (Romanian pronunciation: [koɡəlniˈt͡ʃe̯anu]) may refer to:

- Kogălniceanu family, a Moldavian and Romanian boyar family whose members include:
  - Constantin Kogălniceanu, legislator
  - Enache Kogălniceanu, courtier, man of letters, brother of Constantin
  - Mihail Kogălniceanu, liberal statesman, lawyer, great-grandson of Constantin
  - Vasile Kogălniceanu, agrarian politician, son of Mihail
- Dan Cogălniceanu, actor

== See also ==
- Mihail Kogălniceanu (disambiguation)
