= Nicolae Lupu =

Nicolae Lupu may refer to:

- Nicolae Gh. Lupu (1884–1966), Romanian physician
- Nicolae L. Lupu (1876–1947), Romanian politician and physician
