= Mihail Kogălniceanu (disambiguation) =

Mihail Kogălniceanu (1817–1891) was a Moldavian, later Romanian politician.

Mihail Kogălniceanu may also refer to:

== Places in Romania ==
- Mihail Kogălniceanu, Constanța, a commune in Constanţa County
- Mihail Kogălniceanu, Ialomița, a commune in Ialomiţa County
- Mihail Kogălniceanu, Tulcea, a commune in Tulcea County
- Mihail Kogălniceanu, a village in Râmnicelu Commune, Brăila County
- Mihail Kogălniceanu, a village in Șuțești Commune, Brăila County
- Mihail Kogălniceanu, a village in Coțușca Commune, Botoşani County
- Mihail Kogălniceanu, a village in Smârdan Commune, Galaţi County
- Mihail Kogălniceanu, a village in Țigănași Commune, Iaşi County
- Mihail Kogălniceanu, a village in Arsura Commune, Vaslui County

== Other uses ==
- Mihail Kogălniceanu International Airport, a Romanian airport and a United States Army base in Constanţa County
- NMS Mihail Kogălniceanu, a monitor of the Royal Romanian Navy
  - Mihail Kogălniceanu-class river monitor
