= Volcinschi family =

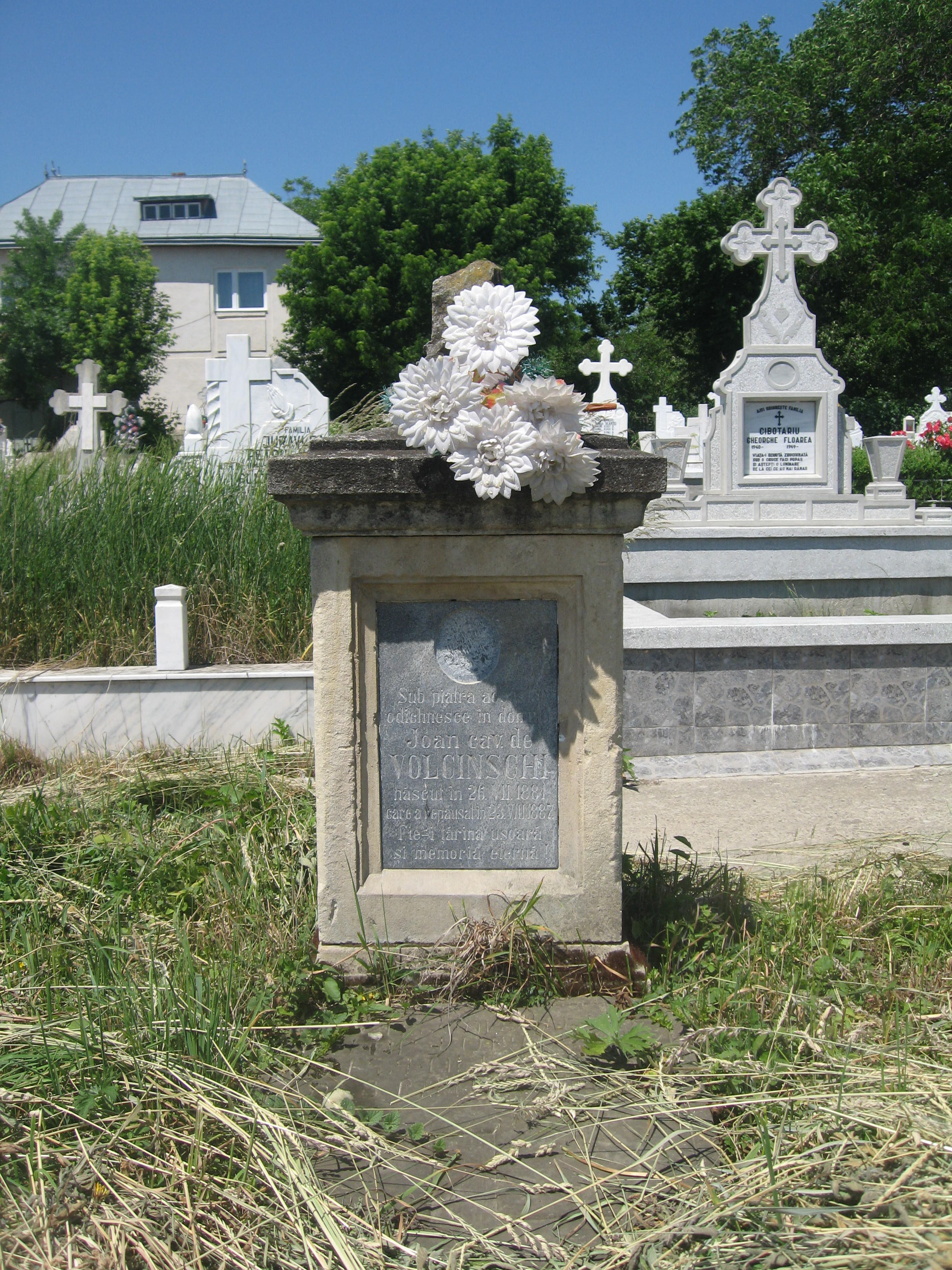
Tomb with family coat of arms of Joan de Volcinschi

The Volcinschi family (or Wolczynski, "from Volcineți" Bukovina) is a noble family from the Eastern European aristocracy which participated with considerable distinction in the social, political and spiritual life of Moldavia and Wallachia.

== History ==
Official studies of genealogy based on the original documents prove Volcinschi family's descent beyond year 1500, being related with old Romanian families from traditional aristocracy, from Moldova and Wallachia and also Europe, like: Beldiman, Bogdan-Musat, Carp, Drăgușescu, Flondor, Movilă, Orăș, Petriceico, Prăjescu, Stroiescu, Stroici, Saint-Quentin, Stârcea, Tăbuci, Tăutu and some more. Noble attestation of this old family has been offered by the historical administrations (Moldavian and House of Habsburg) and also by the King Ferdinand I of Romania, King Carol II of Romania and King Michael I.

== Personalities ==
Matei (Matiaș) Volcinschi (Logothete - 1570);

Mitrecu (Dumitru) Volcinschi Bainschi (High Vornic, Bailiff of Suceava, Burgrave - 1582);

Petriceico (Logothete at Ieremia Movila's Court);

Prodan Dragușescu (Burgrave of Chernivtsi - 1660);

Tănase Volcinschi-Bainschi (Vornic of Bârlad - 1704);

Vasile Bainschi (Great Starost of Suceava, Starost of Focșani and Putna, nephew of Ştefan Petriceicu Voivode of Moldavia, and Grozava, daughter of Ionascu Bogdan of Cantemir and of the daughter of Marica, sister of Miron Barnovschi Movilă);

Dumitrașcu de Volcinschi (Vornic of Câmpulung - 1734);

Anița Volcinschi (Șerban Flondor's wife - from Flondors family of Bucovina - 1747);

Grozava (Logothete Tănase Goian's wife - 1760);

Safta Volcinschi (Gheorghe Carp's wife, ancestor of statesman Petre P.Carp (Prime Minister of Romania and founder of Conservative Party of Romania, 1880–1918);

Ilinca (Elena) de Volcinschi (Gheorghe Flondor's wife, mother of Otto and Elena Gh. Baron Stârcea; remarried with Anatol, Count Bigot de Saint-Quentin);

Ioan Chevalier de Volcinschi (doctor and largest owner of Budineţ and Storojineţ (now in Ukraine) collaborator of "Arboroasa" and "Concordia" political societies. At his castle took place a large number of meetings between revolutionary activists and personalities like Aron Pumnul, Mihai Eminescu, Hurmuzachi brothers, Mihail Kogălniceanu, Vasile Alecsandri and others);

Traian Volcinschi (engineer, aggro-zootechnician, the founder of Romanian apiculture society under the Ministry of Agriculture and "Apimondia" - 1929);

Abbot Gheorghe "Grigorie" Volcinschi (PhD. in Philosophy and Theology of University of Amsterdam and London, Abbot of Putna Monastery and founder of Putna Monastery Museum, he received the Order of the Star of Romania).

== Contemporary descendants ==
Raul Volcinschi (PhD in Economy, Anti-communist Dissident);

Radu Volcinschi (lawyer, advocate of Metropolis of Moldavia and Bukovina);

Liviu Vîlceanu de Volcinschi (Officer of Romanian Army - 1945);

Nicole-Viorel Vîlceanu (mathematician, redactor and director Radio Iași);

Dragoș-Liviu Vîlceanu;

Mihnea-Adrian Vîlceanu;

Nathalie-Teona Vîlceanu;

Peter Lupu-Volcinschi.

Aurora Contescu (n. Volcinschi) (author)

Cristian Ion Contescu (scientist, USA);

Vlad Adrian (Dusi) Contescu (engineer, Romania);

Oliver-Nicolas Vîlceanu.

== Bibliography ==
1. Books

Bălan, T. - Documente bucovinene, Cernăuți, 1934, V, p, 39, p. 351, p. 384, pp. 417–418;
Bălan, T. - Tezaur documentar sucevean. Catalog de documente 1393-1849, București, 1983, p. 388;
Documente și însemnări românești din secolul XVI, București, 1979, doc. XCIV;
Ghibănescu, Gheorghe - Surete și izvoade, IX, p. 144;
Groholski-Miclescu, Sergiu - Arhiva Genealogica SEVER I. ZOTTA, VI (XI), 1999, 1-4, p. 59-72;
Loghin, Constantin - Istoria literaturii române din Bucovina, 1775–1918, Cernăuți, 1996, pp. 210–212;
Miclescu-Prajescu, I.C. - Genealogie și istoriografie, în ArhGen II (VII), 1995, 1-2, p. 1-12;
Prokopowitsch Erich, Wagner Rudolf - Spuren der Deutschen Einwanderung in die Bukowina, Munchen, 1983, p. 128;
Stoicescu, N. - Dicționar al marilor dregători din Țara Românească și Moldova. Sec XIV-XVII, București, 1971, p. 340;
Székely, Maria Magdalena - Noi contribuții la genealogia familiei Stroici, în ArhGen, II (VII), 1995, 1-2;
Székely, Maria Magdalena - Boieri hicleni și înrudirile lor, în ArhGen I(VI), 1994, 1-2, p. 219,228;
Vitenco, Al. - Vechi documente moldovenești, Cernăuți, 1925;
and others

2. Historical works
(according with ArhGen VI (XI), 1999, 1-4, pp. 59–172):

Cantemir, Dimitrie - Historia incrementorum atque decrementorum Aulae Othomanicae, 1714;
Șincai, Gheorghe - Hronica românilor și a mai multor neamuri, 1808;

Researchers: Sergiu Groholski-Miclescu, Sever Zotta, Nicolae Costin, Constantin Filipescu and others.
