= Costache Negri =

Moldavian writer, politician, and revolutionary

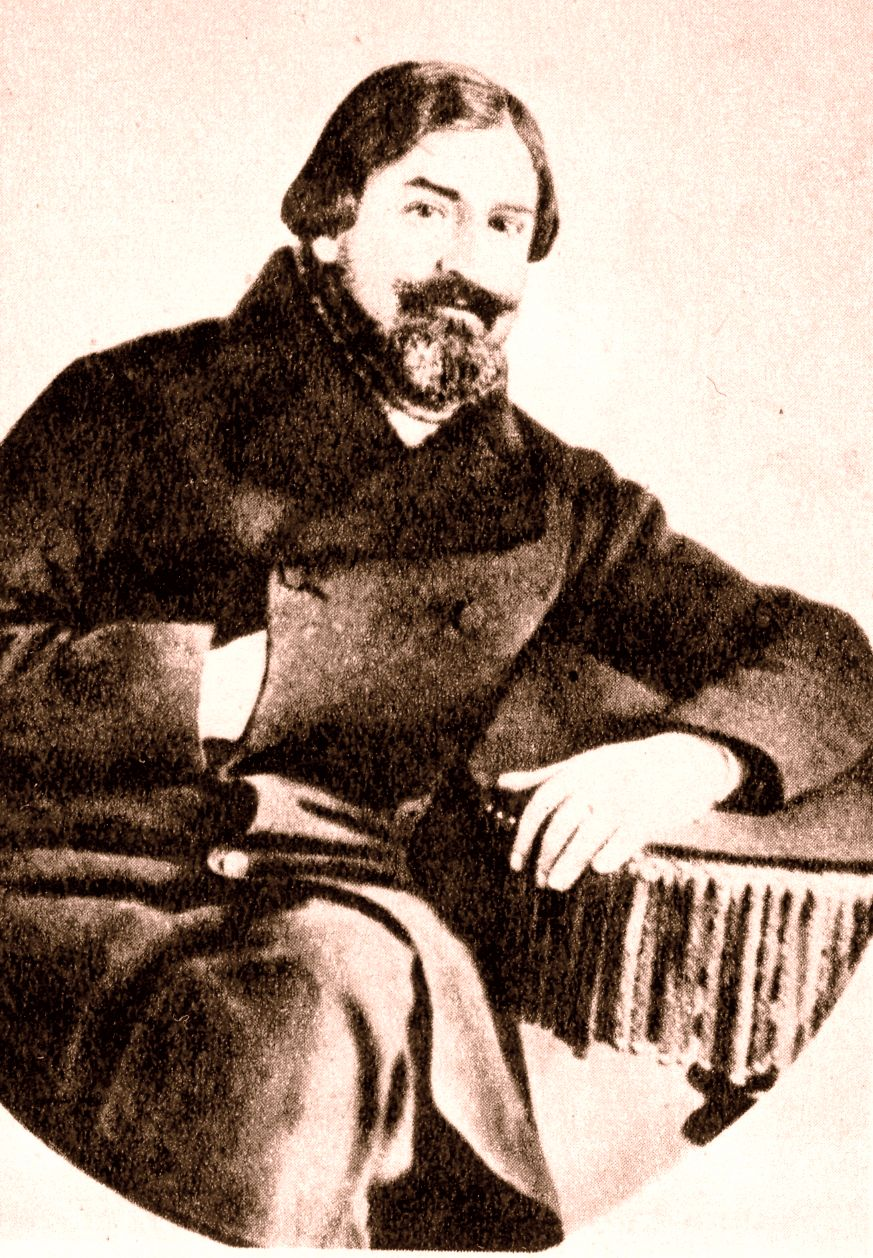
- Born: May 14, 1812; Iași, Moldavia
- Died: September 28, 1876 (aged 64); Târgu Ocna, United Principalities of Moldavia and Wallachia
- Resting place: Târgu Ocna, Bacău County, Romania
- Occupations: writer, politician, revolutionary
- Writing career
- Language: Romanian
- Genres: poems, fables, prose

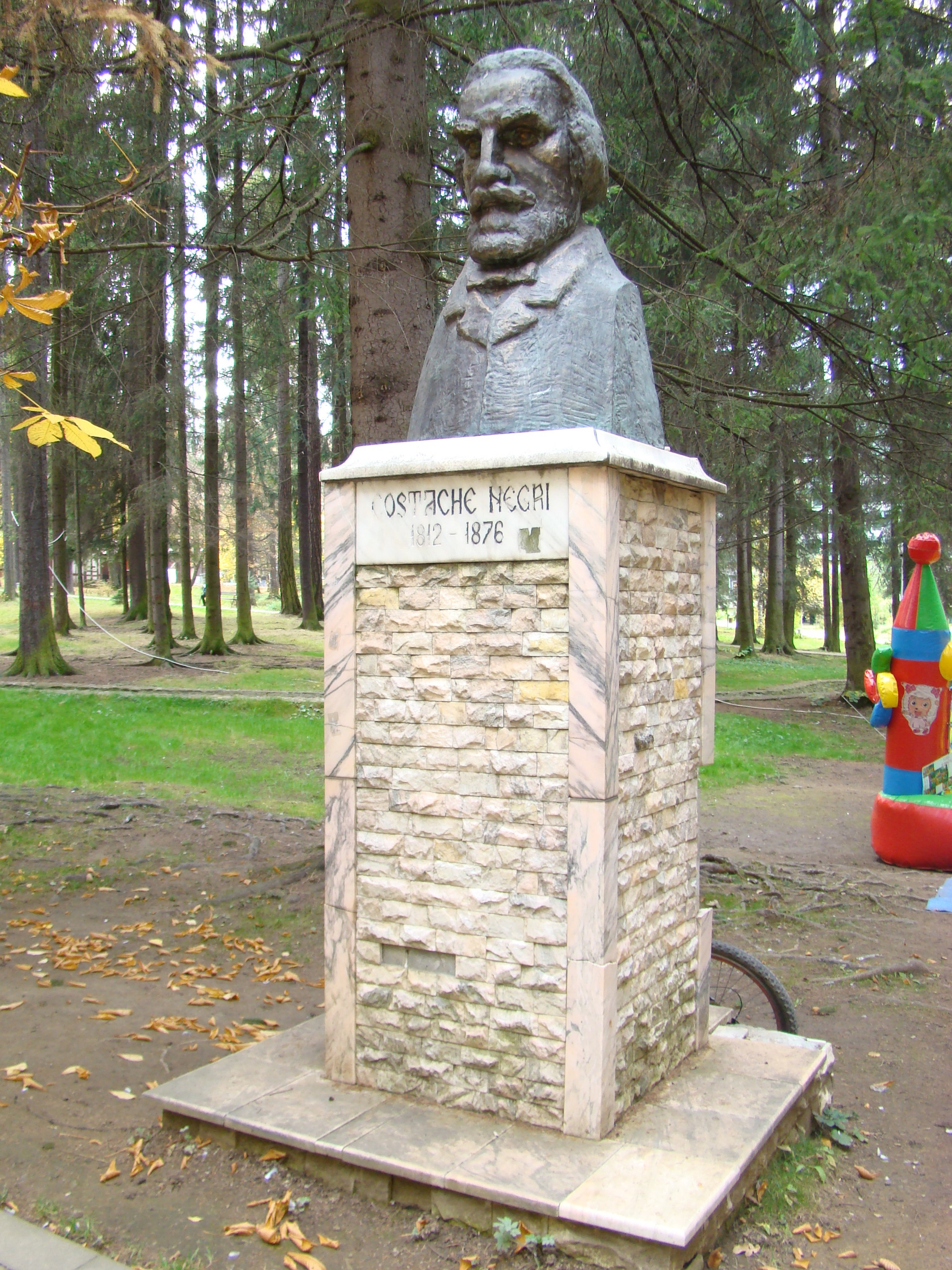
Bust of Negri in Vatra Dornei

Costache Negri (May 14, 1812 – September 28, 1876) was a Moldavian, later Romanian writer, politician, and revolutionary.

Born in Iași, he was the son of vistiernic (treasurer) Petrache Negre. The scion of a boyar family, he was educated at home, and then at the French boarding schools of Mouton in Iași and Repey in Odesa. In 1832 he was sent to pursue his studies in Austria, Germany, France, and Italy. During his stay in Paris he befriended Vasile Alecsandri, Ion Ghica, and Nicolae Bălcescu. Upon returning home, he established in 1841 a literary cenacle at his estate in Mânjina, which became a center of political activism of unionists from Moldavia and Wallachia. The outbreak of the French Revolution of 1848 found Negri in Paris, where he volunteered for action in the revolutionary guards. He then participated in the Blaj National Assembly of May 1848.

After the revolution in Iași, being forbidden to enter Moldavia, he left for Brașov, where he took part in the development of a new revolutionary program. On 24 May [O.S. 12 May] 1848, he signed in Brașov, together with other Moldavian revolutionaries, the pamphlet "Our principles for the reformation of the homeland", in which they demanded the union of Moldavia and Wallachia in an independent state and land reform. Arriving then in Cernăuti, Bukovina, he was elected head of the Moldavian Revolutionary Committee, established on June 9, 1848, by the exiled Moldavian revolutionaries, including Alexandru Ioan Cuza. After refusing, a year later, Bălcescu's proposal to be the head of Romanian emigration abroad, Negri was appointed in 1851 pârcălab (burgrave) for Covurlui County, and in 1854 head of the Department of Public Works, a capacity in which he pleaded, in Vienna and Constantinople, the cause of the Romanian Principalities and their right to autonomy. He joined the Union Committee from Iași in 1856, then the Electoral Committee of the Union in February 1857), and was elected deputy for Galați on September 22, 1857, then vice president of the ad hoc Assembly of Moldavia on October 4, 1857. In 1859, Cuza became the first domnitor (Ruler) of the Romanian Principalities through his double election as prince of Moldavia on 5 January 1859 and prince of Wallachia on 24 January 1859, which resulted in the unification of both states. Negri remained a collaborator and a close adviser of Cuza, especially in foreign policy issues; sent again to Constantinople as a diplomat, he contributed to the recognition by the great powers of the double election of Cuza, and therefore of the Union.

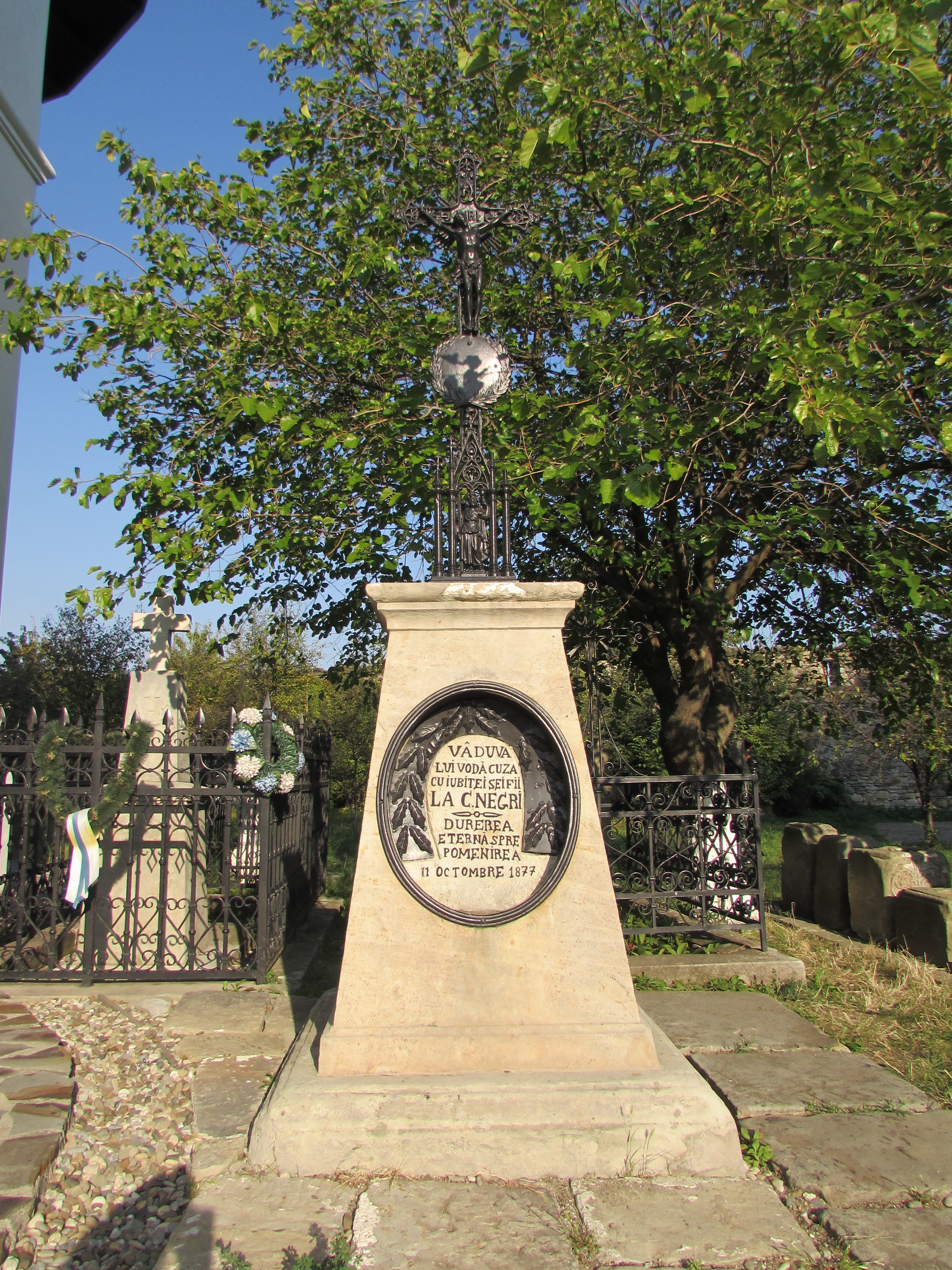
Negri's tomb at the Răducanu Monastery in Târgu Ocna

Encouraged by Alecsandri, Negri starting writing — poems, fables, and prose. He debuted in 1844 with Veneția, a text published in Propășirea. He also wrote for România Literară and Steaua Dunării; some of his poems appeared posthumously in Revista Nouă.

He died in Târgu Ocna, at age 64. His burial site is in the churchyard of the old Răducanu Monastery in Târgu Ocna. Mânjina, the village where his estate was located, was renamed in the 1920s Costache Negri. In 1943, his manor was declared a historical monument and was converted into a memorial house. Streets in Bucharest, Cluj-Napoca, Iași, and Pitești bear his name; high schools in Galați and Târgu Ocna are also named after him.
