= Vladimir Petercă =

Romanian theologian (1944–2022)

Vladimir Petercă (24 April 1944 – 23 September 2022) was a Romanian Roman Catholic theologian who served as rector of the Roman Catholic Institute of Bucharest from 1995 to 2006.

== Biography ==
Vladimir Petercă was born on 24 April 1944, in Mircești village, Iași County. He graduated from the Roman Catholic University with science degree in 1968 and was ordained priest on 15 August 1968 by Petru Pleșca, Roman Catholic Bishop of Iași and titular bishop of Voli. Petercă was part of the same class as the future Roman Catholic Archbishop of Bucharest, Ioan Robu.

With the support of Bishop Pleșca, he followed specialization studies at the Pontifical Biblical Institute in Rome (1973–1977), becoming degreed in Bible and then a Ph.D. student at the Pontifical Gregorian University in Rome (1977–1981). On 1 November 1980 he defended a doctoral thesis in theology, titled "Image of Solomon in Hebrew and Greek Bible – a contribution to the Midrash's study". During the same period, Petercă followed two semesters of courses at the Hebrew University of Jerusalem (in the first theological student exchange between Vatican City and Israel) and earned a bachelor of science degree from the Augustinianum Patristic Institute in Rome.

Back in Romania, during 1981–1995 he worked as lecturer, senior lecturer, and then professor at the Roman Catholic Institute of Iași, teaching courses in Biblical theology, Biblical exegesis, and Biblical languages. From 1990, he also taught introductory courses on the Bible in the Department of History at Alexandru Ioan Cuza University. He was a visiting professor at the University of Münster (1985–1986) and LMU Munich (1988–1989).

From 1 December 1995, Petercă served as rector of the Saint Theresa Roman Catholic Institute of Bucharest, being professor of Biblical sciences. He was a regular presence on radio and television, where he lectured on Biblical and theological themes. In February 2004, he was awarded the Order of Cultural Merit, Commander rank by then-President Ion Iliescu. He retired in 2006.

== Collaboration with the Securitate ==
In 2010, the National Council for the Study of the Securitate Archive (NCSSA) declared that Petercă was a Securitate collaborator since 1971, operating under the conspiratorial names "Preda" and "Radu". He would report directly to the Iași Securitate chief, colonel Constantin Ciurlău; starting in 1986, he would also cooperate with the Directorate for Foreign Intelligence during his trips overseas. He informed on his colleagues and students at the Roman Catholic Institute in Iași, as well as the Western clergy with whom he came into contact. Shortly after the news broke, the priest Eduard Ferenț (one of the people Petercă informed on to the Securitate) said he was "disappointed, as an adult requires a lot more, especially from a priest as we teach students to be honest, be sincere, genuine, loyal, so we have to be" and that he would "not make comments about Vladimir Petercă". Especially affected by Petercă's actions were the priest Petru Mareș, and his brother, Iosif.

In 2011 the Bucharest Court of Appeal confirmed the NCSSA's finding regarding Petercă. On appeal, the decision was annulled, because the court had not been properly notified.

== Books published ==
- De la Abraham la Iosue (in Romanian). București: Institutul Teologic Romano-Catolic. 1996.
- Itinerar tainic (in Romanian). București: Editura Arhiepiscopiei Romano-Catolice. 1997. ISBN 973-98031-6-4. OCLC 895701150.
- Ceasul Adevărului (in Romanian). Iași: Institutul Teologic Romano-Catolic. 1997.
- Drama lui Job, drama omului: analiza unor texte alese (in Romanian). Iași: Institutul Teologic Romano-Catolic. 1997. ISBN 973-0-00531-1. OCLC 234114701.
- Regele Solomon în Biblia ebraică și în cea grecească: contribuție la studiul conceptului de midraș (in Romanian). Iași: Polirom. 1999. ISBN 973-683-254-6. OCLC 71913907.
- Mesianismul in Biblie (in Romanian). Iași: Polirom. 2003. ISBN 9736813339. OCLC 895737199.

== See also ==
- Catholic Church in Romania
