= Mihail Kogălniceanu =

Romanian statesman, lawyer, historian and publicist (1817–1891)

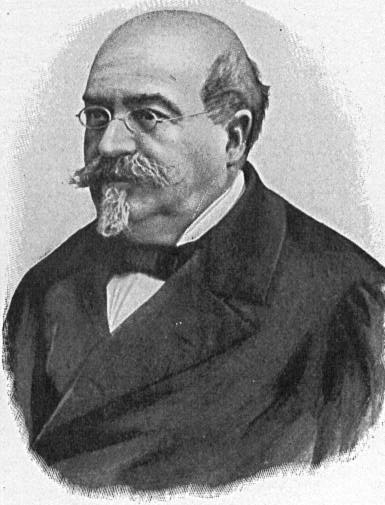

3rd Prime Minister of Romania
- In office 11 October 1863 – 26 January 1865
- Monarch: Alexandru Ioan Cuza
- Preceded by: Nicolae Kretzulescu
- Succeeded by: Constantin Bosianu

Foreign Affairs Minister of Romania
- In office 27 April 1876 – 23 July 1876; 3 April 1877 – 24 November 1878
- Monarch: Carol I
- Preceded by: Dimitrie Cornea; Nicolae Ionescu
- Succeeded by: Nicolae Ionescu; Ion I. Câmpineanu

Internal Affairs Minister of Romania
- In office 11 October 1863 – 26 January 1865; 16 November 1868 – 24 January 1870; 17 November 1878 – 25 November 1878; 11 July 1879 – 17 April 1880
- Monarchs: Alexandru Ioan Cuza; Carol I
- Preceded by: Nicolae Kretzulescu; Anton I. Arion; C. A. Rosetti; Ion Brătianu
- Succeeded by: Constantin Bosianu; Dimitrie Ghica; Ion Brătianu; Ion Brătianu

Personal details
- Born: 6 September 1817 Iași, Moldavia
- Died: 1 July 1891 (aged 73) Paris, France
- Resting place: Eternitatea Cemetery, Iași
- Party: National Liberal Party
- Spouse: Ecaterina Jora
- Education: Humboldt University of Berlin
- Profession: Historian, journalist, literary critic
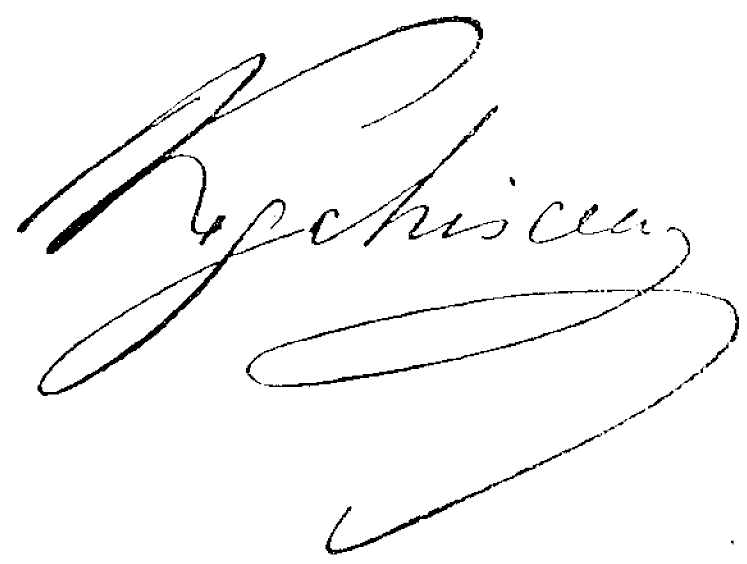
- Signature

Mihail Kogălniceanu OSR (Romanian pronunciation: [mihaˈil koɡəlniˈtʃe̯anu]; also known as Mihail Cogâlniceanu, Michel de Kogalnitchan; September 6, 1817 – July 1, 1891) was a Romanian liberal statesman, lawyer, historian and publicist; he became Prime Minister of Romania on October 11, 1863, after the 1859 union of the Danubian Principalities under Domnitor Alexandru Ioan Cuza, and later served as Foreign Minister under Carol I. He was several times Interior Minister under Cuza and Carol. A polymath, Kogălniceanu was one of the most influential Romanian intellectuals of his generation. Siding with the moderate liberal current for most of his lifetime, he began his political career as a collaborator of Prince Mihail Sturdza, while serving as head of the Iași Theater and issuing several publications together with the poet Vasile Alecsandri and the activist Ion Ghica. After editing the highly influential magazine Dacia Literară and serving as a professor at Academia Mihăileană, Kogălniceanu came into conflict with the authorities over his Romantic nationalist inaugural speech of 1843. He was the ideologue of the abortive 1848 Moldavian Revolution, authoring its main document, Dorințele partidei naționale din Moldova.

Following the Crimean War (1853–1856), with Prince Grigore Alexandru Ghica, Kogălniceanu was responsible for drafting legislation to abolish Roma slavery. Together with Alecsandri, he edited the unionist magazine Steaua Dunării, played a prominent part during the elections for the ad hoc Divan, and successfully promoted Cuza, his lifelong friend, to the throne. Kogălniceanu advanced legislation to revoke traditional ranks and titles, and to secularize the property of monasteries. His efforts at land reform resulted in a censure vote, leading Cuza to enforce them through a coup d'état in May 1864. However, Kogălniceanu resigned in 1865, following his own conflicts with the monarch.

A decade later, he helped create the National Liberal Party, before playing an important part in Romania's decision to enter the Russo-Turkish War of 1877–1878—a choice which consecrated her independence. He was also instrumental in the acquisition, and later colonization, of the Northern Dobruja region. During his final years, he was a prominent member and one-time President of the Romanian Academy, and briefly served as Romanian representative to France.

== Biography ==
=== Early life ===
Born in Iași, he belonged to the Kogălniceanu family of Moldavian boyars, being the son of Vornic Ilie Kogălniceanu, and the great-grandson of Constantin Kogălniceanu (noted for having signed his name to a 1749 document issued by Prince Constantine Mavrocordatos, through which serfdom was disestablished in Moldavia). Mihail's mother, Catinca née Stavilla (or Stavillă), was, according to Kogălniceanu's own words, "[from] a Romanian family in Bessarabia". The author took pride in noting that "my family has never searched its origins in foreign countries or peoples". Nevertheless, in a speech he gave shortly before his death, Kogălniceanu commented that Catinca Stavilla had been the descendant of "a Genoese family, settled for centuries in the Genoese colony of Cetatea Albă (Akerman), whence it then scattered throughout Bessarabia".

During Milhail Kogălniceanu's lifetime, there was confusion regarding his exact birth year, with several sources erroneously indicating it as 1806; in his speech to the Romanian Academy, he acknowledged this, and gave his exact birth date as present in a register kept by his father. It was also then that he mentioned his godmother was Marghioala Calimach, a Callimachi boyaress who married into the Sturdza family, and was the mother of Mihail Sturdza (Kogălniceanu's would-be protector and foe).

Kogălniceanu was educated at Trei Ierarhi monastery in Iași, before being tutored by Gherman Vida, a monk who belonged to the Transylvanian School, and who was an associate of Gheorghe Șincai. He completed his primary education in Miroslava, where he attended the Cuénim boarding school. It was during this early period that he first met the poet Vasile Alecsandri (they studied under both Vida and Cuénim), Costache Negri and Cuza. At the time, Kogălniceanu became a passionate student of history, beginning his investigations into old Moldavian chronicles.

With support from Prince Sturdza, Kogălniceanu continued his studies abroad, originally in the French city of Lunéville (where he was cared for by Sturdza's former tutor, the abbé Lhommé), and later at the University of Berlin. Among his colleagues was the future philosopher Grigore Sturdza, son of the Moldavian monarch. His stay in Lunéville was cut short by the intervention of Russian officials, who were supervising Moldavia under the provisions of the Regulamentul Organic regime, and who believed that, through the influence of Lhommé (a participant in the French Revolution), students were being infused with rebellious ideas; all Moldavian students, including Sturdza's sons and other noblemen, were withdrawn from the school in late 1835, and reassigned to Prussian education institutions.

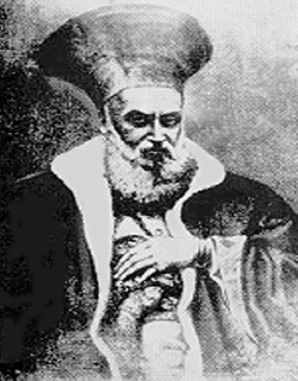
Ilie Kogălniceanu

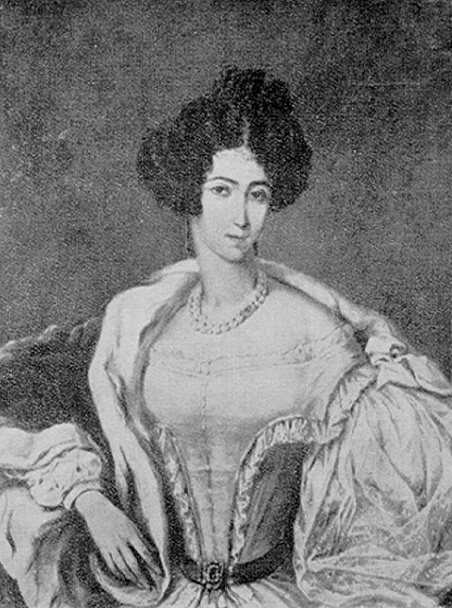
Catinca Stavilla

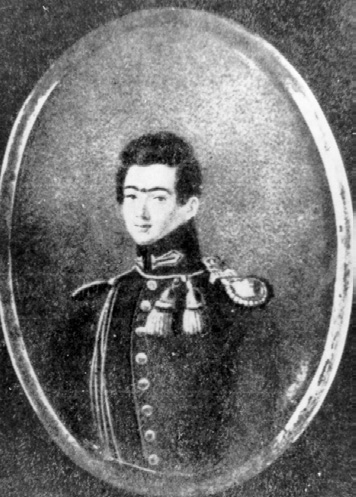
Mihail Kogălniceanu in cadet uniform at age 18

=== In Berlin ===
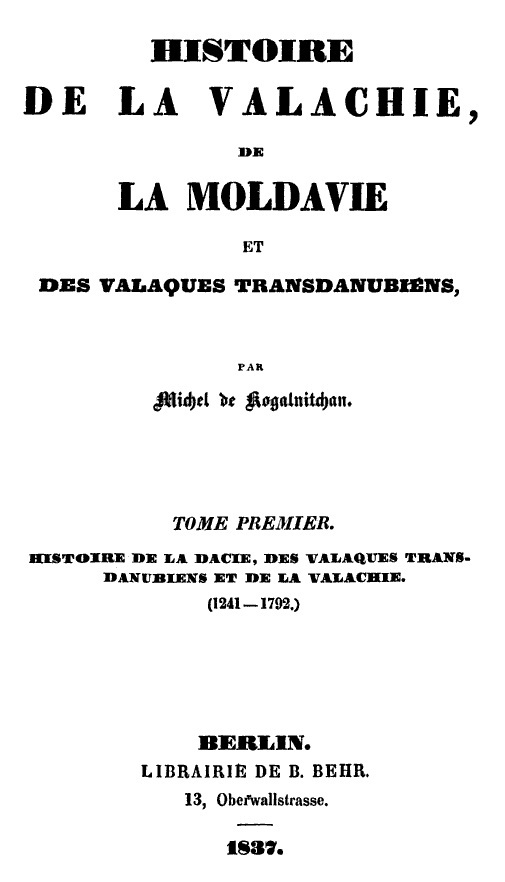
Front page of Histoire de la Valachie, de la Moldavie et des Valaques transdanubiens, signed Michel de Kogalnitchan (1837)

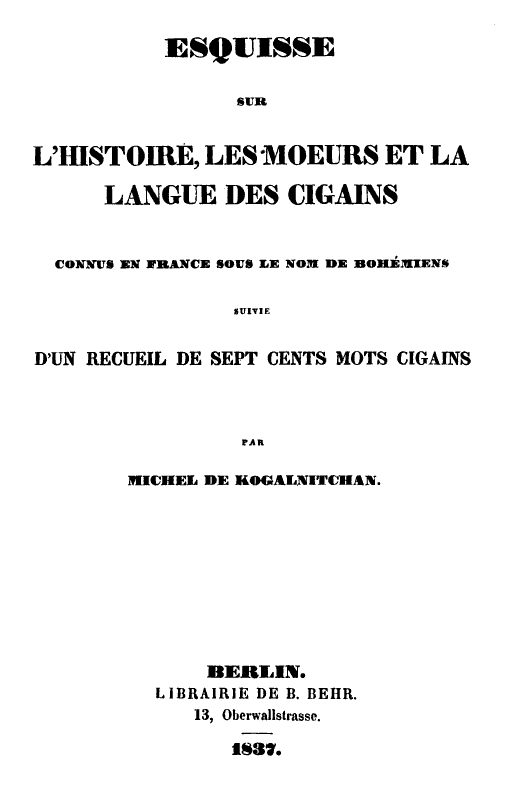
Front page of Esquisse sur l'histoire, les moeurs et la langue des Cigains, connus en France sous le nom de Bohémiens, signed Michel de Kogalnitchan (1837)

During his period in Berlin, he came in contact with and was greatly influenced by Friedrich Carl von Savigny, Alexander von Humboldt, Eduard Gans, and especially Professor Leopold von Ranke, whose ideas on the necessity for politicians to be acquainted with historical science he readily adopted. In pages he dedicated to the influence exercised by Georg Wilhelm Friedrich Hegel on Romanian thought, Tudor Vianu noted that certain Hegelian-related principles were a common attribute of the Berlin faculty during Kogălniceanu's stay. He commented that, in later years, the politician adopted views which resonated with those of Hegel, most notably the principle that legislation needed to adapt to the individual spirit of nations.

Kogălniceanu later noted with pride that he had been the first of Ranke's Romanian students, and claimed that, in conversations with Humboldt, he was the first person to use the modern equivalents French-language of the words "Romanian" and "Romania" (roumain and Roumanie)—replacing the references to "Moldavia(n)" and "Wallachia(n)", as well as the antiquated versions used before him by the intellectual Gheorghe Asachi; historian Nicolae Iorga also noted the part Kogălniceanu played in popularizing these references as the standard ones.

Kogălniceanu was also introduced to Frederica, Duchess of Cumberland, and became relatively close to her son George of Cumberland and Teviotdale, the future ruler of Hanover. Initially hosted by a community of the Huguenot diaspora, he later became the guest of a Calvinist pastor named Jonas, in whose residence he witnessed gatherings of activists in favor of German unification (see Burschenschaft). According to his own recollections, his group of Moldavians was kept under close watch by Alexandru Sturdza, who, in addition, enlisted Kogălniceanu's help in writing his work Études historiques, chrétiennes et morales ("Historical, Christian and Moral Studies"). During summer trips to the Pomeranian town of Heringsdorf, he met the novelist Willibald Alexis, whom he befriended, and who, as Kogălniceanu recalled, lectured him on the land reform carried out by Prussian King Frederick William III. Later, Kogălniceanu studied the effects of reform when on visit to Alt Schwerin, and saw the possibility for replicating its results in his native country.

Greatly expanding his familiarity with historical and social subjects, Kogălniceanu also began work on his first volumes: a pioneering study on the Romani people and the French-language Histoire de la Valachie, de la Moldavie et des Valaques transdanubiens ("A History of Wallachia, Moldavia, and of Transdanubian Vlachs", the first volume in a synthesis of Romanian history), both of which were first published in 1837 inside the German Confederation. He was becoming repulsed by the existence of Roma slavery in his country, and in his study, cited the example of active abolitionists in Western countries.

In addition, he authored a series of studies on Romanian literature. He signed these first works with a Francized version of his name, Michel de Kogalnitchan ("Michael of Kogalnitchan"), which was slightly erroneous (it used the partitive case twice: once in the French particle "de", and a second time in the Romanian-based suffix "-an").

Raising the suspicions of Prince Sturdza after it became apparent that he sided with the reform-minded youth of his day in opposition to the Regulamentul Organic regime, Kogălniceanu was prevented from completing his doctorate, and instead returned to Iași, where he became a princely adjutant in 1838.

=== In opposition to Prince Sturdza ===
Over the following decade, he published a large number of works, including essays and articles, his first editions of the Moldavian chroniclers, as well as other books and articles, while founding a succession of short-lived periodicals: Alăuta Românească (1838), Foaea Sătească a Prințipatului Moldovei (1839), Dacia Literară (1840), Arhiva Românească (1840), Calendar pentru Poporul Românesc (1842), Propășirea (renamed Foaie Științifică și Literară, 1843), and several almanacs. In 1844, as a Moldavian law freed some slaves in Orthodox Church property, his articles announced a great triumph for "humanity" and "new ideas".

Both Dacia Literară and Foaie Științifică, which he edited together with Alecsandri, Ion Ghica, and Petre Balș, were suppressed by Moldavian authorities, who considered them suspect. Together with Costache Negruzzi, he printed all of Dimitrie Cantemir's works available at the time, and, in time, acquired his own printing press, which planned to issue the complete editions of Moldavian chronicles, including those of Miron Costin and Grigore Ureche (after many disruptions associated with his political choices, the project was fulfilled in 1852). In this context, Kogălniceanu and Negruzzi sought to Westernize the Moldavian public, with interest ranging as far as Romanian culinary tastes: the almanacs published by them featured gourmet-themed aphorisms and recipes meant to educate local folk about the refinement and richness of European cuisine. Kogălniceanu would later claim that he and his friend were "originators of the culinary art in Moldavia".

With Dacia Literară, Kogălniceanu began expanding his Romantic ideal of "national specificity", which was to be a major influence on Alexandru Odobescu and other literary figures. One of the main goals his publications had was expanding the coverage of modern Romanian culture beyond its early stages, during which it had mainly relied on publishing translations of Western literature—according to Garabet Ibrăileanu, this was accompanied by a veiled attack on Gheorghe Asachi and his Albina Românească. Mihail Kogălniceanu later issued clear criticism of Asachi's proposed version of literary Romanian, which relied on archaisms and Francized phonemes, notably pointing out that it was inconsistent. Additionally, he evidenced the influence foreign poetry had on Asachi's own work, viewing it as excessive. Tensions also occurred between Kogălniceanu and Alecsandri, after the former began suspecting his collaborator of having reduced and toned down his contributions to Foaie Științifică. During this period, Kogălniceanu maintained close contacts with his former colleague Costache Negri and his sister Elena, becoming one of the main figures of the intellectual circle hosted by the Negris in Mânjina. He also became close to the French teacher and essayist Jean Alexandre Vaillant, who was himself involved in liberal causes while being interested in the work of Moldavian chroniclers. Intellectuals of the day speculated that Kogălniceanu later contributed several sections to Vaillant's lengthy essay about Moldavia and Wallachia (La Roumanie).

In May 1840, while serving as Prince Sturdza's private secretary, he became co-director (with Alecsandri and Negruzzi) of the National Theater Iași. This followed the monarch's decision to unite the two existing theaters in the city, one of which hosted plays in French, into a single institution. In later years, this venue, which staged popular comedies based on the French repertory of its age and had become the most popular of its kind in the country, also hosted Alecsandri's debut as a playwright. Progressively, it also became subject to Sturdza's censorship.

In 1843, Kogălniceanu gave a celebrated inaugural lecture on national history at the newly founded Academia Mihăileană in Iași, a speech which greatly influenced ethnic Romanian students at the University of Paris and the 1848 generation (see Cuvânt pentru deschiderea cursului de istorie națională). Other professors at the Academia, originating in several historical regions, were Ion Ghica, Eftimie Murgu, and Ion Ionescu de la Brad. Kogălniceanu's introductory speech was partly prompted by Sturdza's refusal to give him imprimatur, and amounted to a revolutionary project. Among other things, it made explicit references to the common cause of Romanians living in the two states of Moldavia and Wallachia, as well as in Austrian- and Russian-ruled areas:

"I view as my country everywhere on earth where Romanian is spoken, and as national history the history of all of Moldavia, that of Wallachia, and that of our brothers in Transylvania."

=== Revolution ===
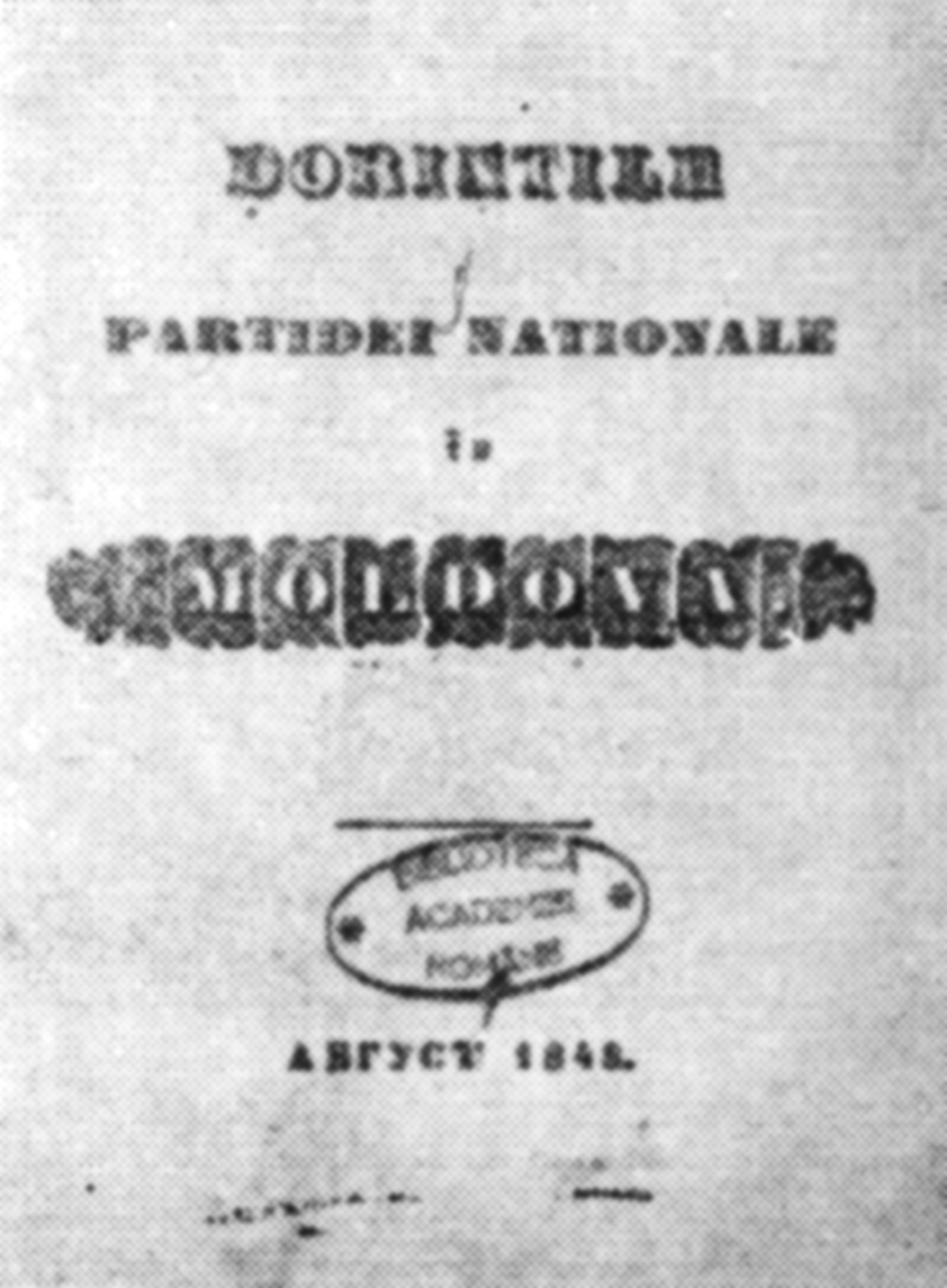
Cover of Dorințele partidei naționale din Moldova

Around 1843, Kogălniceanu's enthusiasm for change was making him a suspect to the Moldavian authorities, and his lectures on History were suspended in 1844. His passport was revoked while he was traveling to Vienna as the secret representative of the Moldavian political opposition (attempting to approach Metternich and discuss Sturdza's ouster). Briefly imprisoned after returning to Iași, he soon after became involved in political agitation in Wallachia, assisting his friend Ion Ghica: in February, during a Romantic nationalist celebration, he traveled to Bucharest, where he met members of the secretive Frăția organization and of its legal front, Soțietatea Literară (including Ghica, Nicolae Bălcescu, August Treboniu Laurian, Alexandru G. Golescu, and C. A. Rosetti).

Having sold his personal library to Academia Mihăileană, Kogălniceanu was in Paris and other Western European cities from 1845 to 1847, joining the Romanian student association (Societatea Studenților Români) that included Ghica, Bălcescu, and Rosetti and was presided over by the French poet Alphonse de Lamartine. He also frequented La Bibliothèque roumaine ("The Romanian Library"), while affiliating to the Freemasonry and joining the Lodge known as L'Athénée des étrangers ("Foreigners' Atheneum"), as did most other reform-minded Romanians in Paris. In 1846, he visited Spain, wishing to witness the wedding of Isabella II and the Duke of Cádiz, but he was also curious to assess developments in Spanish culture. Upon the end of his trip, he authored Notes sur l'Espagne ("Notes on Spain"), a French-language volume combining memoir, travel writing and historiographic record.

For a while, he concentrated his activities on reviewing historical sources, expanding his series of printed and edited Moldavian chronicles. At the time, he renewed his contacts with Vaillant, who helped him publish articles in the Revue de l'Orient. He would later state: "We did not come to Paris just to learn how to speak French like the French do, but also to borrow the ideas and useful things of a nation that is so enlightened and so free".

Following the onset of the European Revolutions, Kogălniceanu was present at the forefront of nationalist politics. Though, for a number of reasons, he failed to sign the March 1848 petition-proclamation which signaled the Moldavian revolution, he was seen as one of its instigators, and Prince Sturdza ordered his arrest during the police roundup that followed. While evading capture, Kogălniceanu authored some of the most vocal attacks on Sturdza, and, by July, a reward was offered for his apprehension "dead or alive". During late summer, he crossed the Austrian border into Bukovina, where he took refuge on the Hurmuzachi brothers' property (in parallel, the Frăția-led Wallachian revolution managed to gain power in Bucharest).

Kogălniceanu became a member and chief ideologue of the Moldavian Central Revolutionary Committee in exile. His manifesto, Dorințele partidei naționale din Moldova ("The Wishes of the National Party in Moldavia", August 1848), was, in effect, a constitutional project listing the goals of Romanian revolutionaries. It contrasted with the earlier demands the revolutionaries had presented to Sturdza, which called for strict adherence to the Regulamentul Organic and an end to abuse. In its 10 sections and 120 articles, the manifesto called for, among other things, internal autonomy, civil and political liberties, separation of powers, abolition of privilege, an end to corvées, and a Moldo-Wallachian union. Referring to the latter ideal, Kogălniceanu stressed that it formed:

"the keystone without which the national edifice would crumble".

At the same time, he published a more explicit "Project for a Moldavian Constitution", which expanded on how Dorințele could be translated into reality. Kogălniceanu also contributed articles to the Bukovinian journal Bucovina, the voice of revolution in Romanian-inhabited Austrian lands. In January 1849, a cholera epidemic forced him to leave for the French Republic, where he carried on with his activities in support of the Romanian revolution.

=== Prince Ghica's reforms ===
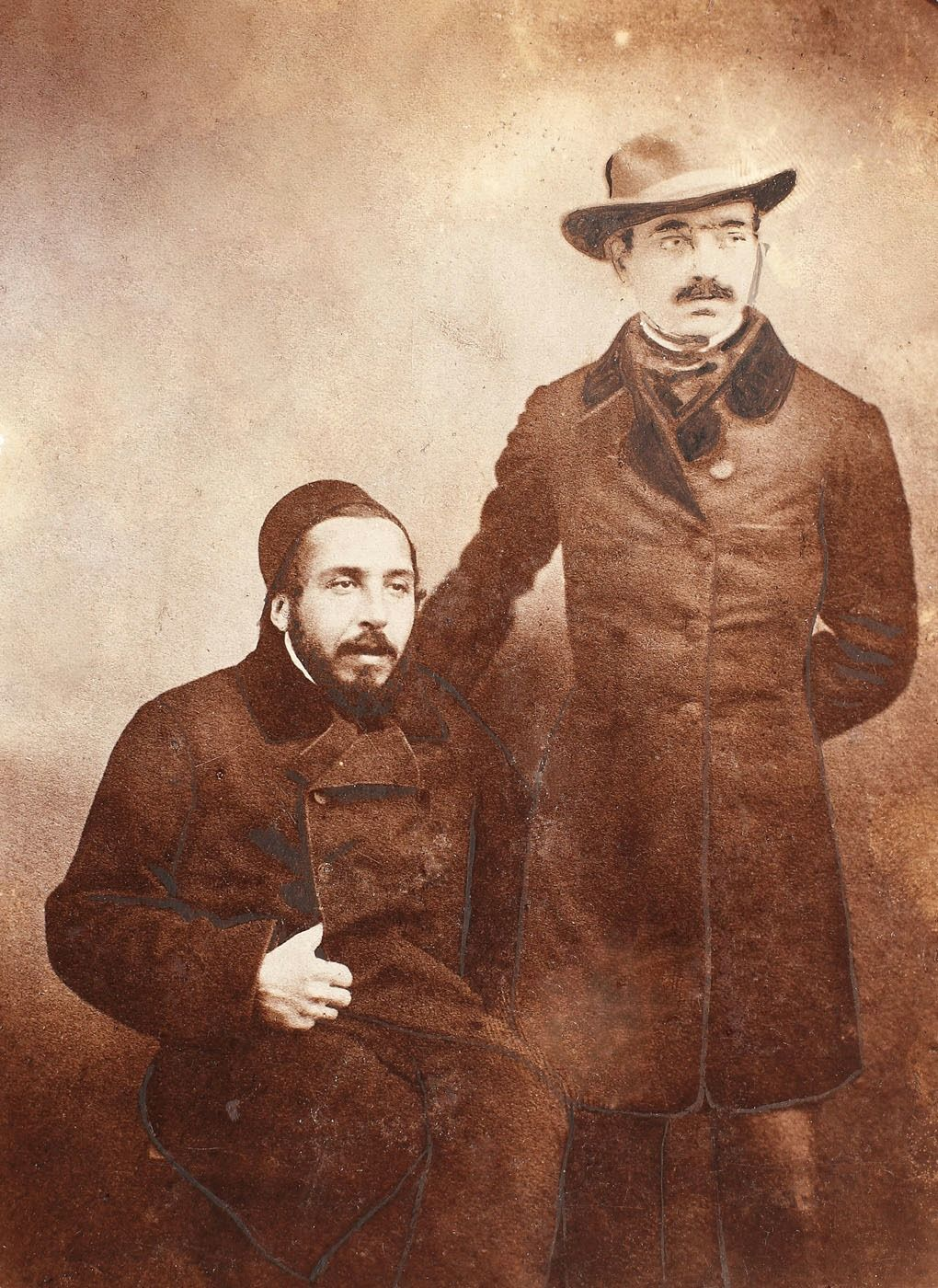
Ion Ghica (seated) and Vasile Alecsandri, photographed in Istanbul (1855)

In April 1849, part of the goals of the 1848 Revolution were fulfilled by the Convention of Balta Liman, through which the two suzerain powers of the Regulamentul Organic regime—the Ottoman Empire and Russia—appointed Grigore Alexandru Ghica, a supporter of the liberal and unionist cause, as Prince of Moldova (while, on the other hand, confirming the defeat of revolutionary power in Wallachia). Ghica allowed the instigators of the 1848 events to return from exile, and appointed Kogălniceanu, as well as Costache Negri and Alexandru Ioan Cuza to administrative offices. The measures enforced by the prince, together with the fallout from the defeat of Russia in the Crimean War, were to bring by 1860 the introduction of virtually all liberal tenets comprised in Dorințele partidei naționale din Moldova.

Kogălniceanu was consequently appointed to various high level government positions, while continuing his cultural contributions and becoming the main figure of the loose grouping Partida Națională, which sought the merger of the two Danubian Principalities under a single administration. In 1867, reflecting back on his role, he stated:

"There is not a single reform, not a single national act, from which my name would be absent. All the major laws were made and countersigned by me."

He inaugurated his career as a legislator under Prince Ghica. On December 22, 1855, legislation he drafted with Petre Mavrogheni regarding the abolition of slavery was passed by the Boyar Divan. This involved the freeing of privately owned Roma slaves, as those owned by the state had been set free by Prince Sturdza in January 1844. Kogălniceanu claimed to have personally inspired the measure. Ghica was prompted to complete the process of liberation by the fate of Dincă, an educated Roma cook who had murdered his French wife and then killed himself after being made aware that he was not going to be set free by his Cantacuzino masters.

Prince Ghica also attempted to improve the peasant situation by outlawing quit-rents and regulating that peasants could no longer be removed from the land they were working on. This measure produced little lasting effects; according to Kogălniceanu, "the cause [of this] should be sought in the all-mightiness of landowners, in the weakness of the government, who, through its very nature, was provisional, and thus powerless".

=== Ad hoc Divan ===
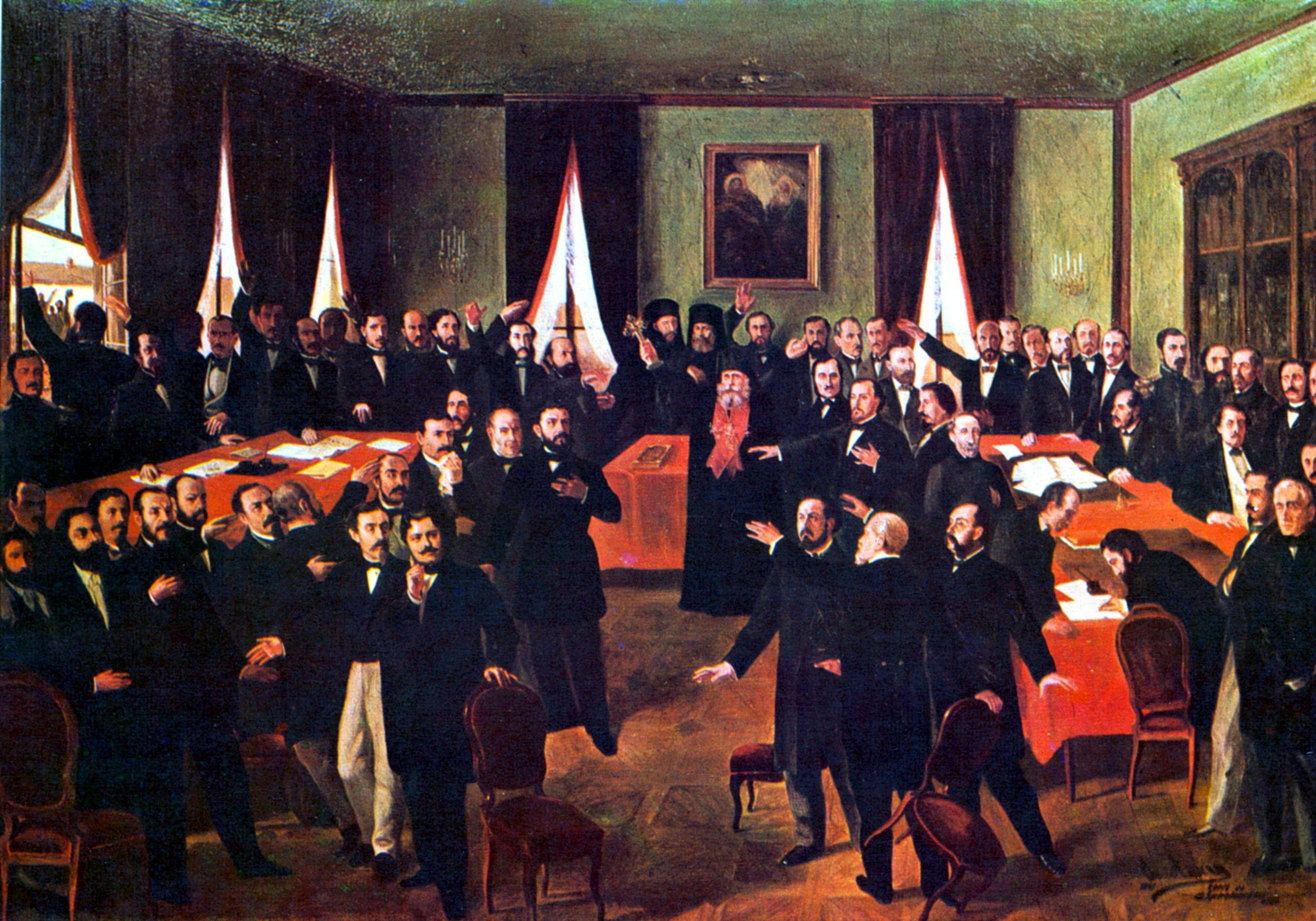
Proclamation of the Moldo-Wallachian union, painting by Theodor Aman

Interrupted by Russian and Austrian interventions during the Crimean War, his activity as Partida Națională representative was successful after the 1856 Treaty of Paris, when Moldavia and Wallachia came under the direct supervision of the European Powers (comprising, alongside Russia and Austria, the United Kingdom, the Second French Empire, the Kingdom of Piedmont-Sardinia, and Prussia). As he later acknowledged, members of the Divan had begun to consider the Paris agreements, and especially the 1858 convention regarding the two countries, as a Constitution of Romania, in place until 1864.

In addition, Kogălniceanu began printing the magazine Steaua Dunării in Iași: a unionist mouthpiece, it enlisted support from Alecsandri and his România Literară. Kogălniceanu encouraged Nicolae Ionescu to issue the magazine L'Étoile de Danube in Brussels, as a French-language version of Steaua Dunării which would also serve to popularize Partida Națională's views. By that time, he was in correspondence with Jean Henri Abdolonyme Ubicini, a French essayist and traveler who had played a minor part in the Wallachian uprising, and who supported the Romanian cause in his native country.

Elected by the College of landowners in Dorohoi County to the ad hoc Divan, a newly established assembly through which Moldavians had gained the right to decide their own future, he kept in line with the Wallachian representatives to their respective Divan, and resumed his campaign in favor of union and increased autonomy, as well as the principles of neutrality, representative government, and, as he said later, rule by "a foreign prince". However, both Kogălniceanu and Alecsandri initially presented themselves as candidates for the regency title of Caimacam—Alecsandri, who was more popular, renounced first in order to back Costache Negri. Negri's candidature was dismissed by the Ottomans, who preferred to appoint Teodor Balș (June 1856).

Following the elections of September 1857, the entire Partida Națională chose to support Cuza for the Moldavian throne. This came after Nicolae Vogoride, the new Caimaicam, carried out an anti-unionist electoral fraud—a suffrage annulled by the common verdict of Napoleon III and Queen Victoria (August 9, 1857, first announced to the world on August 26).

He played the decisive part in the Divan's decision to abolish boyar ranks and privileges, thus nullifying pieces of legislation first imposed under Prince Constantine Mavrocordatos. The final proposal, effectively imposing one law for all, universal conscription and an end to rank-based tax exemptions, was made by a commission which included Kogălniceanu and Vasile Mălinescu, and was passed by the Divan on October 29, 1857, with 73 out of 77 votes (the remaining 4 were all abstentions). Kogălniceanu noted with pride that "The entire nation has accepted this great reform, and everyone, former Princes, great boyars, low-ranking boyars, privileged strata, have received this equalitarian reform, discarding, even without special laws, all that derived from the old regime, and even all that resembled the old regime". He recorded that only two members of the boyar class had subsequently refused to abide by the new principles—the Vornics Iordache Beldiman (in Moldavia) and Ioan Manu (in Wallachia). In November, Partida Națională passed legislation forcing the end of religious discrimination against all non-Orthodox Christians in Moldavia (specifically, against Roman Catholics and Gregorian Armenians). The law had been initiated by Negri.

Many of Kogălniceanu's efforts were centered on bringing about an end to the peasant question, but, as he admitted, his boyar electorate threatened to recall him if he was to pursue this path any further. Consequently, he signed his name to the more moderate proposal of Dimitrie Rallet, which prevented boyars from instituting new corvées, while leaving other matters to be discussed by a future permanent Assembly. This project was instantly rejected by a solid majority of the Assembly, which in Kogălniceanu's view, led to the creation of two poles, "national liberal" and conservative, replacing the unionist-separatist divide and causing political conflicts inside the former unionist majority (thus forming the National Liberal and Conservative parties).

Outmaneuvering the opposition of Vogoride and his group of conservative followers during new elections for the Divan, Kogălniceanu was able to promote Cuza in Moldavia on January 17, 1859, leading to Cuza's election for a similar position in Wallachia (February 5)—the de facto union of the two countries as the United Principalities. In October 1858, he made a clear proposal regarding the unification, which, as he noted, carried the vote with only two opposing voices (Alecu Balș and Nectarie Hermeziu, the Orthodox vicar of Roman Bishopric), being publicly acclaimed by Ion Roată, the peasant representative for Putna County. During 1859, Kogălniceanu again stood in the ad hoc Divan and rallied support for Cuza from all factions of the unionist camp, while promoting his candidature in Bucharest—thus profiting from ambiguities in the Paris Treaty. On the day Cuza took the throne, to begin his rule as Domnitor, Mihail Kogălniceanu welcomed him with an emotional speech.

=== Secularization of monastery estates ===
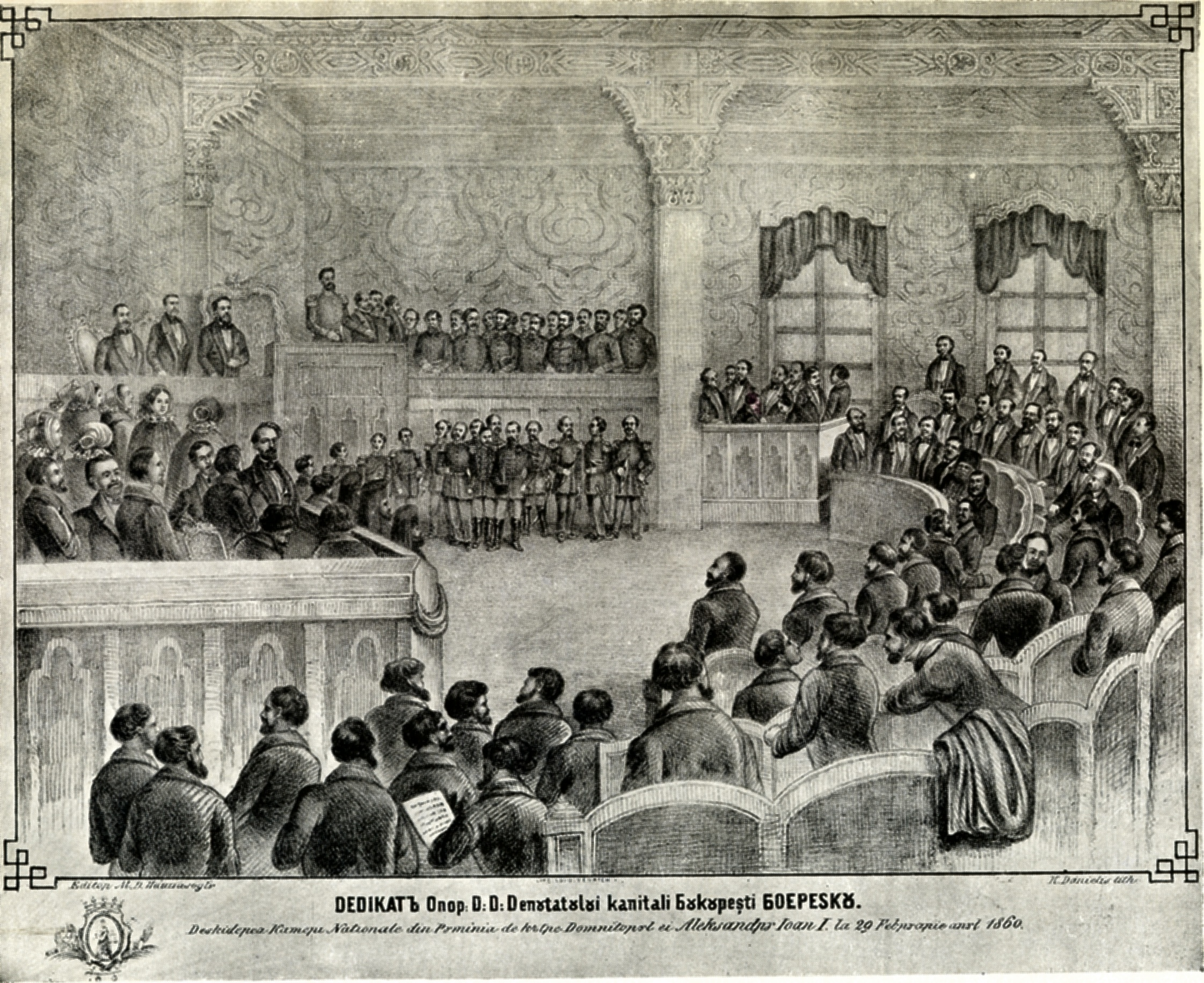
Opening session of the Romanian Parliament in February 1860

From 1859 to 1865, Kogălniceanu was on several occasions the cabinet leader in the Moldavian half of the United Principalities, then Prime Minister of Romania, being responsible for most of the reforms associated with Cuza's reign. His first term in Moldavia ended during December 1860, when Kogălniceanu became involved in the scandal involving Metropolitan Sofronie Miclescu, who opposed Cuza's secularization of the monastery estates. In 1863, secularization was imposed by Cuza, with the land thus freed being divided among peasants—the land reform of 1864, which came together with the universal abolition of corvées.

Although political opposition prevented him from pushing agrarian reform at the time that he proposed it, Mihail Kogălniceanu is seen as the person responsible for the manner in which it was eventually carried out by Cuza. The changes in legislation came at the end of a lengthy process, inaugurated in 1860, when the institution regulating legislative projects for the two principalities, the Conservative-dominated Common Commission of Focșani, refused to create the basis for land reform. Instead, it provided for an end to corvées, while allowing peasants on boyar estates control over their own houses and a parcel of pasture. Known as Legea Rurală (the "Rural Law"), the project received instant support from the then-Premier Barbu Catargiu, leader of the Conservatives, and the target of vocal criticism on Kogălniceanu's part. On June 6, 1862, the project was first debated in parliament, causing a standstill between Cuza and the Conservatives. As noted by historian L. S. Stavrianos, the latter considered the project advantageous because, while preserving estates, it created a sizable group of landless and dependent peasants, who could provide affordable labor.

Late in the same month, Catargiu was mysteriously assassinated on Mitropoliei Hill, on his way back from Filaret, where he had attended a festivity commemorating the Wallachian revolution (he was succeeded by Nicolae Kretzulescu, after the interim premiership of Apostol Arsachi). On June 23, Legea Rurală was passed by Parliament, but Cuza would not promulgate it. According to Kogălniceanu, the Conservatives Arsachi and Kretzulescu were reluctant to propose the law for review by Cuza, knowing that it was destined to be rejected. Discussions then drifted toward the matter of confiscating land from the Greek Orthodox monasteries in Romania (their sizable properties and traditional tax exemptions had been the subject of controversy ever since the Phanariote period). In late 1862, their revenues were taken over by the state, and, during the summer of the following year, a sum of 80 million piasters was offered as compensation to the Greek monks, in exchange for all of the monasteries' land.

As the Ottoman Empire proposed international mediation, Cuza took the initiative, and, on October 23, 1863, deposed the Kretzulescu cabinet, nominating instead his own selection of men: Kogălniceanu as Premier and Interior Minister, Dimitrie Bolintineanu as Minister of Religious Affairs. In order to prevent further international tensions, they decided to generalize confiscation to all Eastern Orthodox Church estates, Greek as well as those of the incipient Romanian Orthodox monasteries. The resolution was passed with 97 out of 100 parliamentary votes. Later, the Greek Church was presented with an offer of 150 million piasters as compensation, which was viewed as two low by its intended recipients, including Patriarch Sophoronius III. Consequently, the Romanian state considered the matter closed. As a direct consequence, one third of the arable land in Moldavia and a fourth of that in Wallachia were made available for a future land reform (one fifth to one fourth of the total arable land in the state as a whole).

=== Cuza's personal regime ===
In the spring of 1864, the cabinet introduced a bill providing for an extensive land reform, which proposed allocating land based on peasant status. The fruntași ("foremost people"), who owned 4 or more oxen, were to receive 5 fălci of land, or approx. 7.5 hectares; mijlocași ("middle people"), with two oxen—approx. 6 hectares; pălmași ("manual laborers"), with no oxen—approx. 3 hectares. Peasants were to own their plots after making 14 yearly payments to their respective landowner. This caused uproar in Parliament, which represented around 4,000 mostly boyar electors, and voices from among the Conservatives deemed it "insane". The latter party prepared a censure vote, based on the fact that Kogălniceanu had publicized the project through Monitorul Oficial in contradiction with the one endorsed by the Focșani Commission, thus going against the letter of the law—he later justified himself saying: "Publication was necessary in order to quell the rural population, agitated by the [alternative project]". The cabinet handed in its resignation, but Cuza refused to countersign it.

Tensions mounted and, on May 14, 1864, Cuza carried out a coup d'état, coinciding with the moment when Conservatives imposed a censure vote. Kogălniceanu read in Parliament the monarch's decision to dissolve it, after which Cuza introduced a new constitution, titled Statutul dezvoltător al Convenției de la Paris ("Statute Expanding the Paris Convention"). Together with a law virtually establishing a system of universal male suffrage, it was submitted to the 1864 plebiscite, gaining support from 682,621 voters out of 754,148.

The new regime passed its own version of Legea Rurală, thus effectively imposing land reform, as well as putting an end to corvées. This was accomplished through discussions in August 1864 by the newly established Council of State, where the law was advanced by, among others, Kogălniceanu, Bolintineanu, George D. Vernescu, Gheorghe Apostoleanu and Alexandru Papadopol-Callimachi. Kogălniceanu's other measures as minister included: the establishment of Bucharest University, the introduction of identity papers, the establishment of a national police corps (comprising Dorobanți units), the unification of Border Police.

More reserved members of the Council asked for the land reform law not to be applied for a duration of three years, instead of the presumed April 1865 deadline, and Cuza agreed. Arguing that Cuza's decision was "the very condemnation and crushing of the law", Kogălniceanu worried that peasants, informed of their future, could no longer be persuaded to carry out corvées. He threatened Cuza with his resignation, and was ultimately able to persuade all parties involved, including the opposition leader Kretzulescu, to accept the law's application as of spring 1865; a proclamation by Cuza, Către locuitorii sătești ("To the Rural Inhabitants") accompanied the resolution, and was described by Kogălniceanu as "the political testament of Cuza". Despite this measure, factors such as a growing population, the division of plots among descendants, peasant debts and enduring reliance on revenues from working on estates, together with the widespread speculation of estate leaseholders and instances where political corruption was detrimental to the allocation of land, made the reform almost completely ineffectual on the long term, and contributed to the countryside unrest which culminated in the Peasants' Revolt of 1907.

With Kogălniceanu's participation, the authoritarian regime established by Cuza succeeded in promulgating a series of reforms, notably introducing the Napoleonic Code, public education, and state monopolies on alcohol and tobacco. At the same time, the regime became unstable and was contested by all sides, especially after his adulterous affair with Marija Obrenović became the topic of scandal. In early 1865, Cuza came into conflict with his main ally Kogălniceanu, whom he dismissed soon after. Over the following months, the administration went into financial collapse, no longer able to provide state salaries, while Cuza came to rely on his own camarilla (courtiers).

After 1863, relations between Mihail Kogălniceanu and his friend Vasile Alecsandri soured dramatically, as the latter declared himself disgusted with politics. Alecsandri withdrew to his estate in Mircești, where he wrote pieces critical of the political developments.

=== Carol's ascent and Mazar Pașa Coalition ===
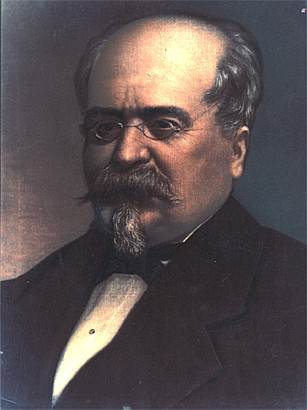
Portrait of an aging Kogălniceanu

Domnitor Cuza was ultimately ousted by a coalition of Conservatives and Liberals in February 1866; following a period of transition and maneuvers to avert international objections, a perpetually unified Principality of Romania was established under Carol of Hohenzollern, with the adoption of the 1866 Constitution. Two years later, in recognition of his scholarly contributions, Kogălniceanu became a member of the newly created Romanian Academy Historical Section.

In November 1868 – January 1870, he was again Minister of the Interior under Dimitrie Ghica. In this capacity, he regulated the design of police uniforms, and investigated the murder of Cuca-Măcăi peasants by rogue Gendarmes.

He was at the time involved in a new diplomatic effort: the Ghica government was aiming to receive formal recognition of the name "Romania", as opposed to "United Principalities". The bid was successful, after the Ottomans gave their approval, but marked a slump in Romania's relationship with Prussia—its Minister President, Otto von Bismarck, abstained on the matter. Such tensions were only worsened when Prussian money was attracted by Ghica into the development of a Romanian Railways system: later Romanian governments confronted themselves with the "Strousberg Affair", a volatile combination of investment scheme failure and anti-Prussian sentiment (see Republic of Ploiești). Although generally depicted as Prussian-friendly, the Conservatives were also opposed to such dealings, and their daily Térra referred to Kogălniceanu as the guilty party. Overall, however, the Francophile Ghica and his minister were not only hostile to Prussia, but also tried to help the national cause of Romanians living in Austria-Hungary (Transylvania, Bukovina, etc.). Reportedly, these pitted them against Domnitor Carol, the Prussian-born Germanophile.

Kogălniceanu's term was confirmed by the 1869 election, after which he was able to persuade Alecsandri to accept a position as deputy for Roman. The poet, who had been nominated without expressing his consent, cast aside hostility and became one of Kogălniceanu's main supporters in the chamber. Also then, Kogălniceanu blocked the republican gambit of his friend Ion Ghica, the acting Premier. When Carol threatened to leave the country and let he liberals deal with all subsequent problems, Kogălniceanu gathered together the party's moderates in a decisive show of support for the monarch.

Even after Cuza left the country and settled in Baden, relations between him and Kogălniceanu remained respectful, but distant: in summer 1868, when both of them were visiting Vienna, they happened to meet, and, without exchanging words, raised their hats as a form of greeting. On May 27, 1873, Kogălniceanu, alongside Alecsandri, Costache Negri, Petre Poni and other public figures, attended Cuza's funeral in Ruginoasa. Speaking later, he noted: "Cuza has committed great errors, but [the 1864 Către locuitorii sătești] shall never fade out of the hearts of peasants, nor from Romania's history".

Kogălniceanu carried on as leader of pragmatic-reformist liberalism in Romania; in loose opposition to the Conservative Party cabinet of Lascăr Catargiu (1875), he began talks with the radical faction of the liberal trend (most notably, Ion Brătianu, Dimitrie Sturdza, Ion Ghica, C. A. Rosetti, Dimitrie Brătianu, and Alexandru G. Golescu), which were carried at the Bucharest residence of Pasha Stephen Bartlett Lakeman. On May 24, 1875, negotiations resulted in the creation of the National Liberal Party—the so-called Coalition of Mazar Pașa.

Kogălniceanu also signed his name to the proclamation Alegătorul Liber ("The Enfranchised Voter"), which stated the main National Liberal goals. He was however an outspoken adversary of his former collaborator Nicolae Ionescu, who, as leader of the liberal splinter group Fracțiunea liberă și independentă, rejected National Liberal politics. In an 1876 speech in front of Parliament, Kogălniceanu attacked Ionescu and his supporters for their political and academic positions, approval from the conservative literary society Junimea and its anti-liberal gazette Timpul.

Like his political career, Kogălniceanu's tracts focused on condemning Austrian ethnic and territorial policies. Also in 1875, he issued from Paris an anti-Austrian brochure about the Romanian cause in Bukovina. Called Rapt de la Bukovine d'après les documents authentiques ("The Rape of Bukovina, from Genuine Documents"), it reused old texts collected by the Hurmuzachis. The propaganda effort won support from across the floor: Junimea Conservatives (Titu Maiorescu, Theodor Rosetti, Ioan Slavici), National Liberals (D. Sturdza) and independents (Alexandru Odobescu) all signed up to the enterprise.

Kogălniceanu joined other National Liberals in expressing opposition to the trade convention Catargiu had signed with Austria-Hungary, which was advantageous to the latter's exports, and which, they claimed, was leading Romanian industry to ruin. He accepted it while in office, but looked into adopting European-like patent laws, as a measure of encouraging local industries. A National Liberal government would repeal the agreement in 1886.

=== Romanian independence ===
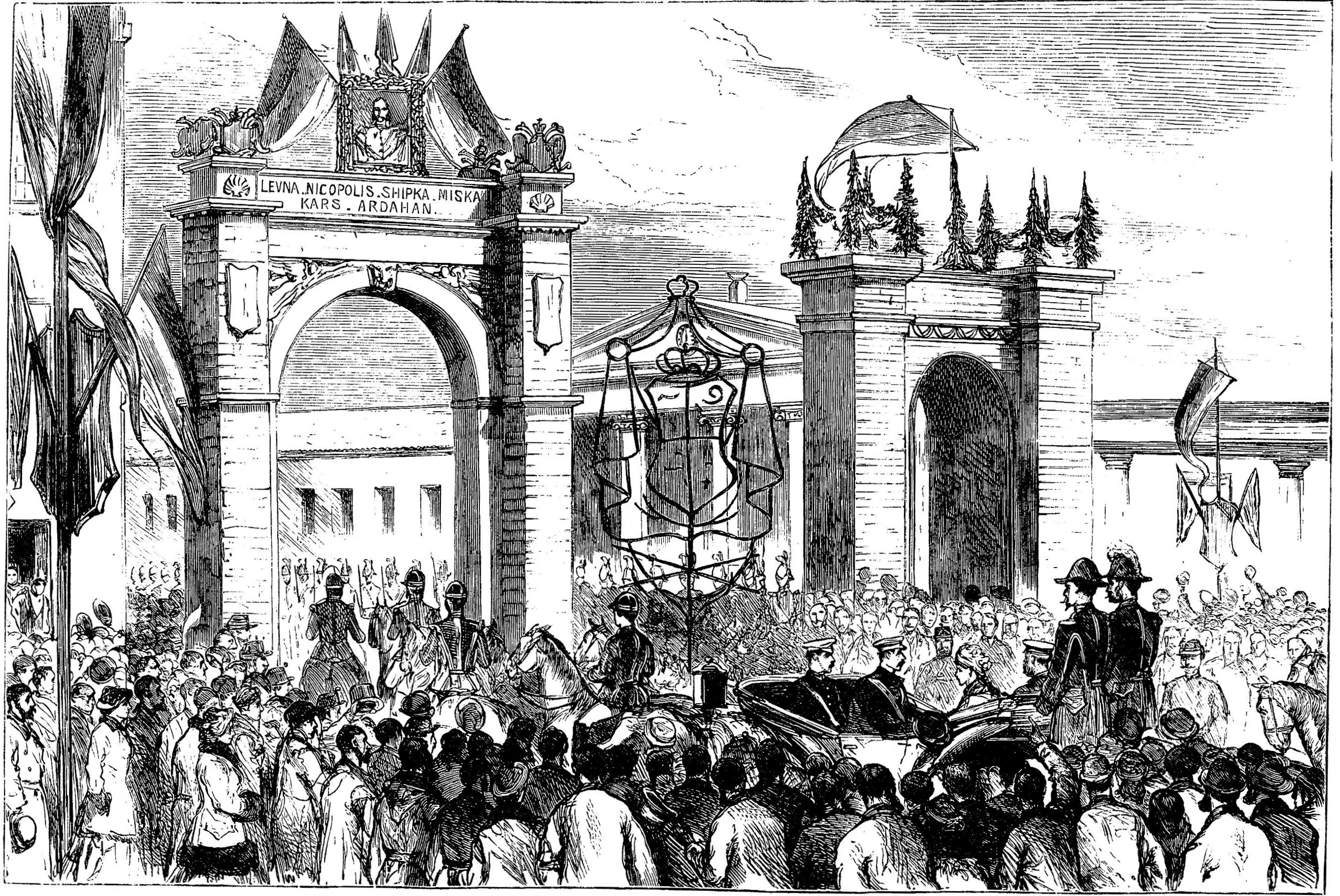
Russians enter Bucharest (The Illustrated London News, 1877)

Serving as Foreign Affairs Minister in the Ion Brătianu cabinet (spring-summer 1876, and again from April 1877 to November 1878), Mihail Kogălniceanu was responsible for Romania entering the War of 1877–1878 on the Russian side, which led the country to proclaim its independence (see Romanian War of Independence). He initially tried to obtain diplomatic recognition from various states, but the European states rejected the offer, and the Ottoman Porte ignored them. The Russian envoy Dimitri Stuart received instructions to "halt" Kogălniceanu's initiatives, so as not to aggravate the "Eastern Question".

Upon his return to office, Kogălniceanu personally organized conspiratorial meetings with the Russian diplomat Aleksandr Nelidov, and approved Russian demands in exchange for co-belligerency. With C. A. Rosetti and Brătianu, he supported the transit of Russian troops and persuaded Carol to accept the Russian alliance, contrary to the initial advice of the Crown Council. He also sought advice on this matter from the French Third Republic, who was still one of the powers supervising Romania; Louis, duc Decazes, the French Foreign Minister, declined to give him a reassuring answer, and pointed that, were Romania to join up with Russia, the other powers would cease offering their protection. Making note of this, Kogălniceanu expressed his hope that France would still support his country at the decisive moment.

In the end, the Russian declaration of war came as a surprise to both Carol and Kogălniceanu, who had not been informed of the exact date (April 23) when the Imperial Russian Army would start moving into Moldavia—hence, Romanians tended to regard it as an invasion. Also alarming for Kogălniceanu, the official Russian proclamation addressed Romanians as protegés of the Empire. Bilateral tensions were somewhat alleviated by Russian apologies and, later, by the Ottoman pledge to annex Romania; addressing a discontented Parliament, Kogălniceanu asserted that the Russian road was the country's only choice.

On May 9, 1877, it was through Kogălniceanu's speech in Parliament that Romania acknowledged she was discarding Ottoman suzerainty. He was rewarded by Carol, becoming one of the first three statesmen received into the Order of the Star of Romania. The Minister also negotiated the terms under which the Romanian Land Forces were to join the war effort in Bulgaria, specifically demanding Russian reparations and indemnities.

Over the following year, he coordinated efforts to have the act recognized by all European states, and stated that his government's policies were centered on "as rapid as possible, the transformation of foreign diplomatic agencies and consulates in Bucharest into legations". Late in 1877, he traveled to Austria-Hungary and met Austrian Foreign Minister Gyula Andrássy. He recorded a mood of opposition to the Romanian military effort, but received guarantees of border security. The main challenge was convincing Bismarck, who had since become Chancellor of the German Empire, and who was very reserved on the issue of Romanian independence.

=== Congress of Berlin and Northern Dobruja ===
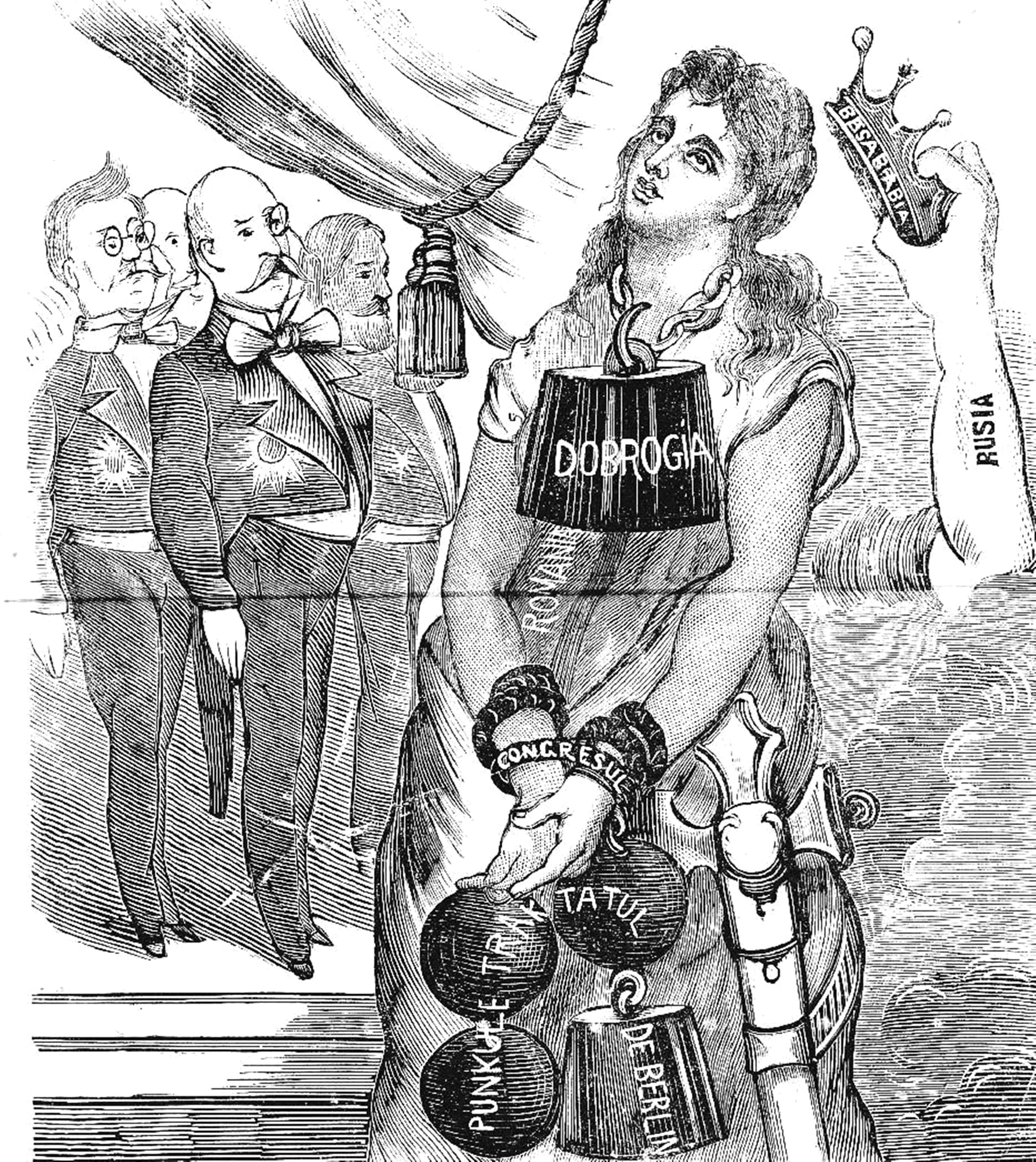
Romanian reactions toward the Congress of Berlin: in this 1878 cartoon, Romania is robbed of her crown ("Bessarabia", in fact Southern Bessarabia) and weighed down by the addition of Northern Dobruja

Upon the war's end, Mihail Kogălniceanu and Ion Brătianu headed the Romanian delegation to the Congress of Berlin. In this capacity, they protested Russia's offer to exchange the previously Ottoman-ruled Northern Dobruja for Southern Bessarabia, a portion of Bessarabia that Romania had received under the 1856 Treaty of Paris. This came after months of tension between Romania and Russia, generated over the territorial issue and the Russian claim to be representing Romania at Berlin: Kogălniceanu's envoy (Eraclie Arion) had even threatened the Russians with a Romanian denunciation of their alliance, and 60,000 Romanian soldiers were prepared for the defense of Southern Bessarabia. The Conference's ultimate decision (Berlin Treaty) was in favor of Russia's proposal, largely due to support from Andrássy and William Henry Waddington, the French Minister of Foreign Affairs. Additional pressures came from Bismarck. The Russians themselves did register some setbacks by the end of the Conference. Their demands for Romania to allow indefinite military transit through Northern Dobruja were made ineffectual by the opposition of other European states, and Kogălniceanu was able to obtain the retrocession of Snake Island.

As an effect of Waddington's intervention, Romania also agreed to resolve the issue of Jewish Emancipation. The government pledged itself to naturalize all of its non-Christian residents (see History of the Jews in Romania). Kogălniceanu himself made efforts to overturn this decision, and was bitter when the Germans refused to compromise. The resolution was debated inside Romania over the following year, and such a measure in respect to Jews was not introduced until 1922–1923.

This outcome was the subject of controversy in Romania, where the territorial exchange was generally considered unfair, with some voices even arguing that the country could again accept Ottoman suzerainty as a means to overturn the state of affairs. Unbeknown to them, the cession of Southern Bessarabia had been secretly agreed upon with Nelidov in early 1877. Even then, against his subordinates in the diplomatic corps, but in consonance with the Domnitor, Kogălniceanu privately noted that he "fully agreed" with it, and that he regarded the new province as a "splendid acquisition". However, in April 1877, Kogălniceanu had explicitly assured Parliament that no real threat loomed over Southern Bessarabia. By that point in time, both the Germans and the Austrians had begun suspecting that Kogălniceanu was in fact a favorite and agent of influence of the Russians, and, reportedly, he even encouraged the rumor to spread. Andrássy reportedly commented: "Prince Carol is really unfortunate to have people like Mr. Kogălniceanu in his service".

Opposition came from both Conservative and National Liberal legislators, who viewed Northern Dobruja as an inhospitable, nonstrategic and non-Romanian territory. Contrarily, with his proclamation to the peoples of Northern Dobruja, Kogălniceanu enshrined the standard patriotic narrative of the events: he asserted that the region had been "united" with Romania, as a "Romanian land", because of the people's wishes and sacrifices. During the heated parliamentary sessions of late September 1878, he helped swing the vote in favor of the annexation, with speeches which also helped transform the public's mood, and which promised a swift process of Romanianization. These addresses are credited with having first backdated the Romanian claim to ca. 1400, when Wallachia briefly held the Principality of Karvuna.

In 1879, again head of Internal Affairs, Kogălniceanu began organizing the administration of Northern Dobruja, through decrees. He supported a distinct legal regime, as a transition from Ottoman administration, and a period of rebuilding—in effect, a colonial rule, aiming for the assimilation of locals into the Romanian mainstream, but respectful of Dobrujan Islam. Unlike other partisans of colonization (including scientist Ion Ionescu de la Brad), Kogălniceanu saw the new territory as open only to ethnic Romanian homesteaders. His intercession played a part in the ethnic policies: he is reported to have personally urged the Romanian pastoralists (Mocani) to abandon their traditional lifestyle and their Bessarabian homes, offering them the option of purchasing Northern Dobrujan land. This had become widely available after the partition of Ottoman estates, the nationalization of land once owned by the Muhajir Balkan, and the appropriation of uncultivated plots (miriè). Kogălniceanu also advised the local administration to overrepresent existing Romanian communities in the decision-making process.

=== Final years ===
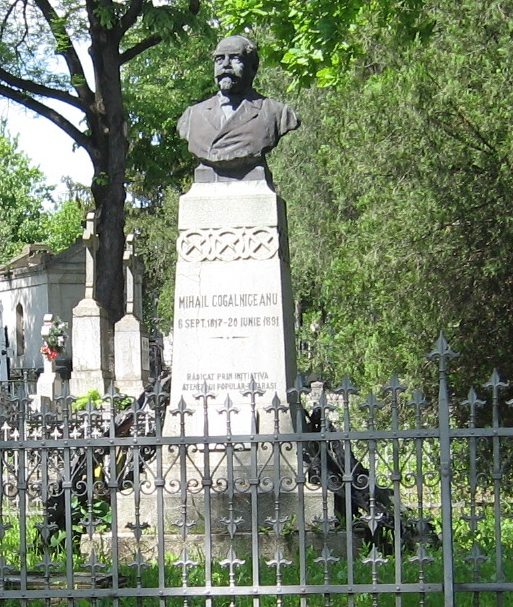
Kogălniceanu's grave in Iași

Kogălniceanu subsequently represented his country in France (1880), being the first Romanian envoy to Paris, and having Alexandru Lahovary on his staff. The French state awarded him its Legion of Honour, with the rank of Grand Officier. In January 1880 – 1881, Kogălniceanu oversaw the first diplomatic contacts between Romania and Qing China, as an exchange of correspondence between the Romanian Embassy to France and Zeng Jize, the Chinese Ambassador to the United Kingdom.

Upon his return to the newly proclaimed Kingdom of Romania, Kogălniceanu played a prominent part in opposing further concessions for Austria, on the issue of international Danube navigation. By 1883, he was becoming known as the speaker of a liberal conservative faction of the National Liberal group. Kogălniceanu and his supporters criticized Rosetti and others who again pushed for universal (male) suffrage, and argued that Romania's fragile international standing did not permit electoral divisiveness.

After withdrawing from political life, Kogălniceanu served as Romanian Academy President from 1887 to 1889 (or 1890). Having fallen severely ill in 1886, he spent his final years editing historical documents of the Eudoxiu Hurmuzaki fund, publicizing Ancient Greek and Roman archaeological finds in Northern Dobruja, and collecting foreign documents related to Romanian history. One of his last speeches, held in front of the academy and witnessed by both Carol, who had since become King of Romania, and his wife Elisabeth of Wied, was a summary of his entire career as a politician, intellectual, and civil servant. In August 1890, while traveling through the Austrian region of Vorarlberg, he was troubled by news that Alecsandri had died at his home in Mircești. Writing to Alecsandri's wife Paulina, he asked: "I could not be present at his funeral, [therefore] you'll allow me, my lady, since I have unable to kiss him either alive or dead, to at least kiss his grave!"

Mihail Kogălniceanu died while undergoing surgery in Paris, and was succeeded in his seat at the academy by Alexandru Dimitrie Xenopol. He was buried in his native Iași, at the Eternitatea cemetery.

== Views ==
=== Liberalism and conservatism ===
Mihail Kogălniceanu's contributions as a leader of opinion and statesman have won acclaim for their role in shaping the development of modern Romania before and after 1848. Nicolae Iorga, a major historian of the 20th century, celebrated Kogălniceanu as "the founder of modern Romanian culture, the thinker who has seen in clarity the free and complete Romania [...], the redeemer of peasants thrown into serfdom [a reference to corvées], the person understanding all the many, secretive, and indissoluble connections linking the life of a people to the moral quality and the energy of its soul".

Kogălniceanu was a democratic and nationalist politician who combined liberalism with the conservative principles acquired during his education, taking inspiration from the policies of the Prussian statesmen Baron vom und zum Stein and Karl August von Hardenberg. German statesmen were however disinclined to consider him one of their own: Bernhard von Bülow took for granted rumors that he was an agent of the Russians, and further alleged that the Romanian land reform was a sham.

Supportive of constitutionalism, civil liberties, and other liberal positions, Kogălniceanu prioritized the nation over individualism, an approach with resonated with the tendencies of all his fellow Moldavian revolutionaries. In maturity, Kogălniceanu had become a skeptic with respect to the French Revolution and its Jacobin legacy, arguing: "civilization stops when revolutions begin". At the same time, his connections within Freemasonry, mirroring the conviction and affiliation of most 1848 revolutionaries, were an important factor in ensuring the success of Romanian causes abroad, and arguably played a part in the election of Cuza, who was himself a member of the secretive organization.

Inside the Romanian liberal faction, and in contrast to his moderation on other topics, he was among the very few to tie together modernization, democracy, and the need to improve the situation of peasants (other notable politicians to do so were Nicolae Bălcescu, who died in late 1852, and Rosetti, who advocated a strict adherence to majoritarianism). Kogălniceanu praised Bălcescu's manifestos and activism in favor of the peasantry, indicating that they formed a precedent for his own accomplishments, while deploring the Wallachian uprising's failure to advance a definitive land reform. When faced with a negative response in the census-elected Parliament just prior to Cuza's coup, he defended his land reform project with the words:

"Two thousand boyars do not a nation make; that is an undeniable truth."

Late in his life, while crediting the University of Berlin and its notions of patriotism with having provided him with "the love for the Romanian motherland and the liberal spirit [emphasis in original]", he stressed:

"In my lengthy combats and actions, in the grim persecutions that have more than once been exercised as a means to crush me, I always had before my eyes those beautiful words which [...] Prince Hardenberg indicated as the strongest means to reawaken the character and manliness of the German people in order to liberate it from the foreign yoke, to raise and increase Germany: «Democratic principles as part of a monarchic government!»"

=== Antisemitism ===
Like many of his fellow Romanian liberals, Kogălniceanu advocated a series of antisemitic policies. He used his position as Internal Affairs Minister in the Dimitrie Ghica executive to resume the expulsions of Jewish community members from the countryside (thus denying them various sources of income). When faced with the official protests of European states, he replied that the matter was nobody's business but Romania's. He usually referred to the Jewish community in general with the insulting term jidani, and accepted their presence on Romanian soil as a concession to their alleged "too numerous and too powerful presence in Europe". During the 1930s, such attitudes, together with Kogălniceanu's involvement in peasant causes, were cited as a precedent by politicians of the fascist National Christian Party and Iron Guard, who, while promoting rural traditionalism, advocated restricting civil rights for the Jewish community.

Nevertheless, Kogălniceanu's antisemitic discourse was nuanced and less violent than that of some of his contemporaries. According to historian George Voicu, he stood for "a complicated balance in dealing with the 'Jewish question'", one between "antisemitic intransigence" and "concessions". The more radical antisemite and National Liberal Bogdan Petriceicu Hasdeu expressed much criticism of this moderate stance (which he also believed was represented within the party by Rosetti and Ion Ghica), and he even claimed that Kogălniceanu was a secret "faithful" of the Talmud. In 1885, Kogălniceanu strongly objected to a National Liberal cabinet decision to expel Moses Gaster, a renowned Jewish scholar, stating that the latter was "[the] only man who works in this country" (he would later celebrate him as the man "to whom Romanian literature owes so much"). Five years later, as rapporteur on naturalization issues, he conferred citizenship upon Marxist thinker Constantin Dobrogeanu-Gherea, who was a Russian-born Jewish immigrant. Shortly before his death, he reportedly endorsed a similar measure for Jewish scholar Lazăr Șăineanu, expressing condemnation for those antisemites within his own party who made efforts to block it.

=== Cultural tenets ===
In his polemical history tracing the development of literary criticism and its role in Romanian culture, the 20th century author Garabet Ibrăileanu made ample mention of Kogălniceanu's role in combating nationalist excesses, in particular the post-1840 attempts by Transylvanian and Wallachian intellectuals to change the fabric of the Romanian language by introducing strong influences from Latin or other modern Romance languages. To illustrate this view, he cited Kogălniceanu's Cuvânt pentru deschiderea cursului de istorie națională, which notably states:

"In me you shall find a Romanian, but ever to the point where I would contribute in increasing Romanomania, that is to say the mania of calling ourselves Romans, a passion currently reigning foremost in Transylvania and among some of the writers in Wallachia."

Ibrăileanu additionally credited the Moldavian faction, Kogălniceanu included, with having helped introduce spoken Romanian into the literary language, at a time when both Ion Heliade Rădulescu and successors of the Transylvanian School made use of the dialect prevalent in Orthodox and Greek-Catholic religious culture. This was in connection with Kogălniceanu's advocacy of pragmatic Westernization: "Civilization never does banish the national ideas and habits, but rather improves them for the benefit of the nation in particular and of humanity in general". He was averse to fast cultural reforms, stressing that acclimatization was always required.

A generation younger than Ibrăileanu, George Călinescu also noted the contrast between Mihail Kogălniceanu and his predecessors, as two sets of "Messianist" intellectuals—in this contrast, Heliade Rădulescu was "hazy and egotistic", whereas Kogălniceanu and others had "a mission which they knew how to translate into positive terms". As a historian, Kogălniceanu notably introduced several more or less influential Romantic nationalist theses: after 1840, he was noted for stressing the image of the 17th-century Wallachian Prince Michael the Brave as a unifier of Romania, although this view had not been at all present in his earlier essays; he proposed that the Romanian folk was among the first European peoples to record history in their national language, although the earliest Romanian-language chronicles date back to the 17th century; additionally, he argued that the Second Bulgarian Empire was a Romanian state. In some of his works, he claimed that Romanians traditionally practiced endogamy to preserve their purity. His 1837 study of the Romani people (Esquisse sur l'histoire, les moeurs et la langue des Cigains, or "Sketch of the History, Mores and Language of the Cigains") is however still seen as a groundbreaking work in its field. According to historian Viorel Achim, while it "does not reach the standards of scientific research", the book is still "a genuine contribution" to "Romology", and "a work of reference".

As early as 1840, Mihail Kogălniceanu was urging writers to seek inspiration for their work in Romanian folklore in creating a "cultured literature". In 1855, after the Wallachian revolution was defeated and most of its leaders went into exile, he noted that the lighter toll Russian intervention had in Moldavia contributed to the preservation of literature; alongside similar statements made by Vasile Alecsandri, this allowed Ibrăileanu to conclude that, after 1848, Moldavia played a bigger part in shaping the cultural landscape of Romania. Writing more than half a century after the critic, historian Lucian Boia also noted that, while Kogălniceanu stressed national unity, his discourse tended to place emphasis on Moldavian particularities. Also according to Ibrăileanu, Kogălniceanu and Alecu Russo have set the foundation for the local school of literary criticism, and, together, had announced the cultural professionalism advocated by Junimea after the 1860s. The latter conclusion was partly shared by Călinescu, Tudor Vianu and literary researcher Z. Ornea. Nevertheless, in its reaction against the 1848 generation, Junimea, and especially its main figure Titu Maiorescu, tended to ignore or outright dismiss Kogălniceanu's causes and the attitudes he expressed.

While commenting on the differences between Moldavian and Wallachian literature, Paul Zarifopol gave a more reserved assessment of Kogălniceanu's position, arguing that the emphasis he had placed on "national taste" would occasionally result in acclaim for mediocre writers such as Alexandru Hrisoverghi. Călinescu observed that much of Kogălniceanu's own prose works imitated the style of his friend Costache Negruzzi, without carrying the same artistic weight, while noting that his few works of autobiography featured "pages of gracious [and] good-natured melancholy", which he attributed to the author's traditional upbringing. Also among Kogălniceanu's anthumous writings was Fiziologia provincialului în Iași ("The Physiology of the Parochial Man in Iași"), closely based on a French model by Pierre Durand and, through it, echoing Jean Anthelme Brillat-Savarin's Physiologie du goût. It was part of a series of such texts, popular in his generation and deemed "the first age of Romanian realism" by researcher Maria Protase. Among the other pieces were two comedy plays, both written in 1840, when he was co-director of the National Theater Iași: Două femei împotriva unui bărbat ("Two Women against One Man") and Orbul fericit ("The Happy Blind Man"). Kogălniceanu's Notes sur l'Espagne was published decades after his death, and received much critical acclaim.

In 1841, Kogălniceanu, together with Costache Negruzzi, printed the first cookbook in the Romanian language: 200 Proven Recipes for Dishes, Pastries, and Other Household Works.

== Legacy ==
=== Descendants ===
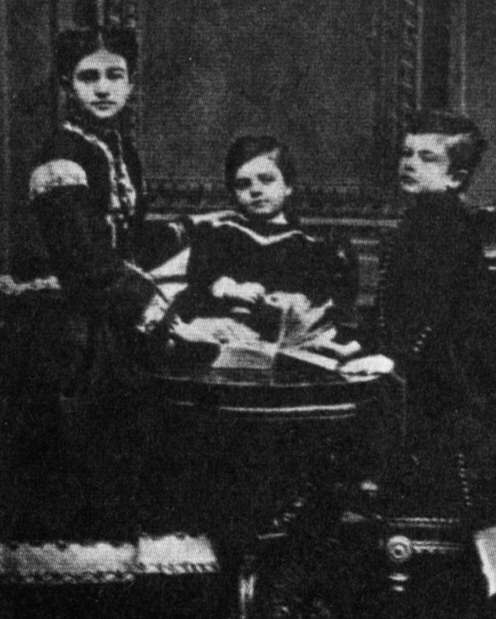
From right: Vasile, Ion and Lucia Kogălniceanu, photographed during the 1850s

Mihail Kogălniceanu was married to Ecaterina Jora (1827–1907), the widow of Iorgu Scorțescu, a Moldavian Militia colonel; they had more than eight children together (three of whom were boys). The eldest son, Constantin, studied Law and had a career in diplomacy, being the author of an unfinished work on Romanian history. Ion, his brother, was born in 1859 and died in 1892, being the only one of Mihail Kogălniceanu's male children to have heirs. His line was still surviving in 2001. Ion's son, also named Mihail, established the Mihail Kogălniceanu Cultural Foundation in 1935 (in 1939–1946, it published a magazine named Arhiva Românească, which aimed to be a new series of the one published during the 1840s; its other projects were rendered ineffectual by the outbreak of World War II).

Vasile Kogălniceanu, the youngest son, was noted for his involvement in agrarian and left-wing politics during the early 20th century. A founder of Partida Țărănească (which served as an inspiration for the Peasants' Party after 1918), he was a collaborator of Vintilă Rosetti in campaigning for the universal suffrage and legislating Sunday rest. A manifesto to the peasants, issued by him just before the Peasants' Revolt of 1907, was interpreted by the authorities as a call to rebellion, and led to Kogălniceanu's imprisonment for a duration of five months. A member of the Chamber of Deputies for Ilfov County, he served as a rapporteur for the Alexandru Averescu executive during the 1921 debates regarding an extensive land reform.

Vasile's sister Lucia (or Lucie) studied at a boarding school in Dresden during the late 1860s-early 1870s. Her third husband, Leon Bogdan, was a local leader of the Conservatives in Neamț County (according to the memoirist Constantin Argetoianu, Lucia was the one exercising real control over the organization's branch). After the Conservative Party faded out of politics as a result of World War I, she came to support the People's Party. Argetoianu later speculated that she was the most intelligent of the Kogălniceanu children, and claimed that Mihail Kogălniceanu had himself acknowledged this (quoting him as saying, "too bad Lucie is not a boy"). She was the mother of eight; one of her daughters, Manuela, married into the Ghica family.

Kogălniceanu's nephew, Grigore, himself a local leader of the Conservative Party and a major landowner, married to Adela Cantacuzino-Pașcanu, a member of the Cantacuzino family. He died in 1904, leaving his wife a large fortune, which she spent on a large collection of jewels and fortune-telling séances. Adela Kogălniceanu was robbed and murdered in October 1920; rumor had it that she had been killed by her own son, but this path was never pursued by authorities, who were quick to cancel the investigation (at the time, they were faced with the major strikes of 1920).

=== Landmarks and portrayals ===
Mihail Kogălniceanu's residence in Iași is kept as a memorial house and public museum. His vacation house in the city, located in Copou area and known locally as Casa cu turn ("The House with a Tower"), was the residence of composer George Enescu for part of the Romanian Campaign, and, in 1930, was purchased by the novelist Mihail Sadoveanu (in 1980, it became a museum dedicated to Sadoveanu's memory). The Kogălniceanu property in Râpile, Bacău County, was sold and divided during the early 20th century.

Chronicles edited by Kogălniceanu and Costache Negruzzi were the source of inspiration for several historical novelists, beginning with Alexandru Odobescu. His relationship with the peasant representative to the ad hoc Divan, Ion Roată, is briefly mentioned in an anecdote authored by Ion Creangă (Moș Ion Roată). He is also the subject of a short writing by Ion Luca Caragiale (first published by Vatra in 1894). Symbolist poet Dimitrie Anghel, whose father, the National Liberal parliamentarian Dimitrie A. Anghel, had been well acquainted with Kogălniceanu, authored a memoir detailing the fluctuating relationship between the two political figures, as well as detailing one of the former Premier's last speeches.

Kogălniceanu is the subject of many paintings, and features prominently in Costin Petrescu's fresco at the Romanian Athenaeum (where he is shown alongside Cuza, who is handing a deed to a peasant). In 1911, Iași became host to Kogălniceanu bronze statue by Raffaello Romanelli, purported to have been recast from one of the sculptor's older works. In 1936, the Mihail Kogălniceanu Cultural Foundation commissioned Oscar Han to create a monument dedicated to Kogălniceanu, which was erected in Bucharest during the same year. Actors have portrayed Kogălniceanu in several Romanian films—most notably, Ion Niculescu in the 1912 Independența României, and George Constantin in Sergiu Nicolaescu's 1977 Războiul Independenței. During the latter stages of the Romanian Communist regime, under Nicolae Ceaușescu, Mihail Kogălniceanu's image was present in official propaganda, alongside those of other historical figures who were considered progressive.

The historian's name was given to several places and landmarks; these include downtown Bucharest's Mihail Kogălniceanu Square (near the Izvor metro station, and housing Han's sculpture) and Mihail Kogălniceanu Boulevard, the Mihail Kogălniceanu commune in Constanța County, the Mihail Kogălniceanu International Airport (situated 26 km northwest of Constanța, and serving that city, the airport also houses a U.S. Military Forces base), and the Mihail Kogălniceanu University in Iași (the first private university in Moldavia, founded in 1990). In Lunéville, a plaque was dedicated to him by the French state.
