= Secularization of monastic estates in Romania =

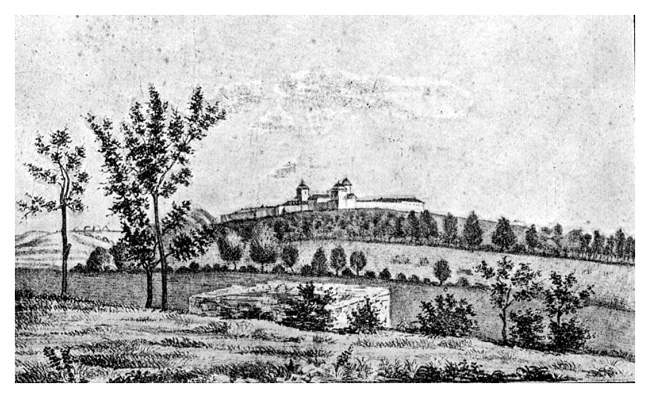
1860 engraving showing the Cotroceni Monastery and its estate in Bucharest

The law on the secularization of monastic estates in Romania was proposed in December 1863 by Domnitor Alexandru Ioan Cuza and approved by the Parliament of Romania. By its terms, the Romanian United Principalities (as the state was then known) confiscated the large estates owned by the Eastern Orthodox Church in Romania (which was in strict obedience to the Greek Orthodox Church at the time). One of the measures ensuring secularism and the separation of church and state, it was also designed to provide an arable land reserve for land reform, without raising the issue of boyar estates.

Probably more than a quarter of Romania's farmland was controlled by untaxed Eastern Orthodox "Dedicated Monasteries", which supported Greek and other foreign monks in shrines such as Mount Athos and Jerusalem. These estates, which were mostly formed under Phanariote reigns in Wallachia and Moldavia respectively, had a low productivity and were also a substantial drain on state revenues.

The measure was unpopular among both Liberal and Conservative groupings, but it had both popular support and the support of Romania's suzerain, the Ottoman Empire. On December 23, the Ottoman Empire requested the intervention of the "guaranteeing powers" (the United Kingdom, the French Empire, Italy, the Austrian Empire, Prussia, and the Russian Empire — all had been overseeing Romania since the 1856 Treaty of Paris) to influence the country in passing the bill. However, Prime Minister Mihail Kogălniceanu did not wait for their intervention, and on December 25, 1863, he introduced the bill into Parliament, which voted 93 to 3 in favor.

In August 1863, Cuza offered 82 million gold Romanian leu as compensation to the Greek Orthodox Church, but Sophronius III, the Patriarch of Constantinople, refused to negotiate; after several years, the Romanian government withdrew its offer and no compensation was ever paid. State revenues thereby increased without adding any domestic tax burden.
