= Kogălniceanu family =

Moldavian family

Kogălniceanu coat of arms

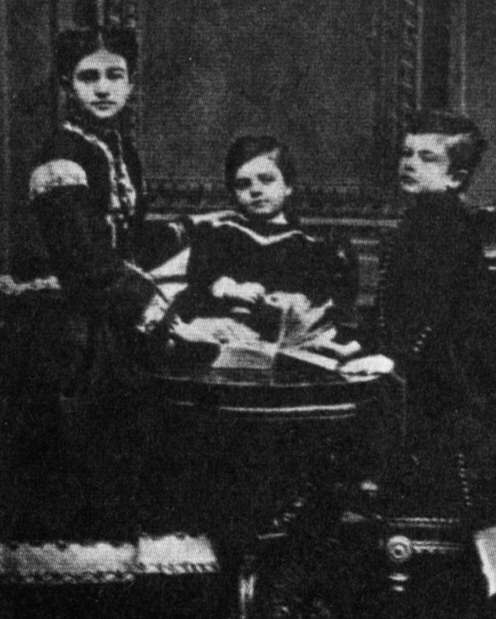
From right: Vasile, Ion and Lucia Kogălniceanu, photographed during the 1850s

The Kogălniceanu family, Kogălniceanul or Cogâlniceanu (Romanian pronunciation: [koɡəlniˈt͡ʃe̯anu]; Romanian: Familia Kogălniceanu, Kogălniceni or Kogălnicenii; Francized de Kogalnitchan) was one of the major political, intellectual and aristocratic families in Moldavia, with branches in modern Romania. Originally Bessarabian peasants, the first Kogălniceanus accumulated wealth and, as owners of the Scrivulenii (Râpile) estate, climbed into the boyar elite. They were also important as skilled members of the Moldavian bureaucracy, and, through brothers Constantin and Enache, also made contributions to 18th-century Romanian literature. Their work was matched and surpassed three generations later by possibly the most famous member of the family, historian and statesman Mihail Kogălniceanu, one of the founders of modern Romania and of Romanian liberalism.

Some of the 20th-century Kogălniceanus were politically significant, supporting either the Conservative or People's Parties. Among the latter category, Mihail's son Vasile Kogălniceanu is chiefly remembered for his activism in support of land reform. A generation later, the Kogălniceanu male line had almost died out, but, through the female descendants, the family had become related to other important political (formerly boyar) clans: the Sturdzas, the Ghicas etc.

== Origins ==
The Kogălniceanu's ancestral home was in the Moldavian subregion of Bessarabia, more specifically in Lăpușna County, on the shores of the eponymous Cogâlnic River. As noted by author Neagu Djuvara, they were one of the few local families to make use of the suffix -eanu, traditional among the boyar clans of neighboring Wallachia, but virtually replaced by common unsuffixed family names among Moldavian notabilities. During the 19th century, the Kogălniceanus had a seal or crest which showed a flower, a sword and a comital crown.

According to Mihail Kogălniceanu, the first attested member of the family, and the first bearer of the name, was Ioan. He is described as a yeoman (răzeș), who had acquired property in Bujor and Călmățui villages. Probably elevated to minor boyardom, Ioan earned his living as a scribe (diac), and purchased land in Moldavia-proper. This property, located in Fălciu County, was extended by Ioan's son, Vasile. In 1666, he purchased Scrivulenii hamlet, the family's fief (ocină), place of rest, and preferred burial ground during some 200 years.

Vasile Kogălniceanu's sons split the clan into three separate branches: Iachim's descendants fell back into yeomanry, while Sandu's accumulated wealth. Sandu himself was well integrated into the gentry, abandoning his office of scribe and rising to the rank of captain in Moldavia's standing army. Vasile (d. 1750), who was also a captain, moved to the Moldavian capital city of Iași, after marrying a local, and joined the staff of Moldavian Princes. His wife's dowry included a manor, opposite from Bârnova Monastery, where the family was residing around 1730.

In autumn 1739, following the devastating Russo-Austrian-Turkish War, returning Prince Grigore II Ghica rented the Kogălniceanu home, which served as both his temporary court and the quarters of his administration. When Vasile complained about this burden, Ghica agreed to move out, and granted the Kogălniceanus a solemn writ: "forevermore may these houses be protected and defended and may this man and his prodigy inhabit them in peace, neither shaken nor disturbed by anyone." Vasile's interest was always centered on Iași, for which reason Scrivulenii remained deserted and was partly occupied by squatters.

== From Neculai to Ilie Kogălniceanu ==
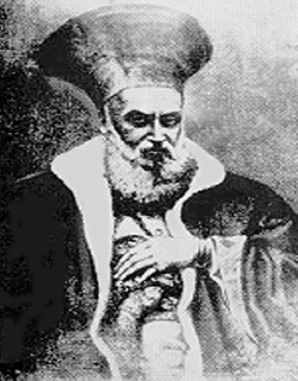
Ilie Kogălniceanu in traditional boyar costume

Vasile had several children, including Neculai, Constantin (ca. 1725–1775) and Enache Kogălniceanu (ca. 1730–1795). Constantin began his administrative career by serving Constantine Mavrocordatos, under whom he was Logothete charged with fiscal matters. Constantin's main achievement is his participation in the abolition of serfdom, carried out by Mavrocordatos in 1749. Constantin Kogălniceanu's name was also attached to the three letters of protest that Moldavian boyars sent over to Moldavia's suzerain power, the Ottoman Empire, complaining about the issues of administration. Around the year 1753, he set out to reassert his claim over Scrivulenii, pressing Prince Matei Ghica to issue him an unequivocal land grant—Ghica did so, some three years later.

The younger Enache was page (copil de casă), and Matei Ghica's rival, Prince Constantin Racoviță, raised him to the rank of Third Comis (Master of the Horse). While his brothers acquired their own houses, he remained in possession of the Bârnova home. Enache followed the Prince to his new throne in Wallachia, and then to a new rule over Moldavia, where he presided over the Boyar Divan and the Aprod courts. With brother Constantin, he supervised the reconstruction of Racoviță's palatial residence at Doamna.

The project was a success, but Racoviță was deposed by the Ottoman overlord, and took Enache with him to the exiled court of Fener. Constantin, with the reputation of an exquisite administrator, went on to serve Prince Ioan Teodor Callimachi. Raised to the rank of Stolnic (1758), he had to tackle the economic downfall of previous reigns, and managed to replenish the Moldavian treasury by appointing his choice of Ispravnici (tax collectors). Callimachi also used Constantin in the aftermath of Budjak Horde invasions into Bessarabia. Appointed Sardar of Chișinău, he rebuilt the counties of Lăpușna, Orhei and Soroca. During Mavrocordatos' return on the throne (1769) and the Russo-Turkish War, he was himself Ispravnic over Hârlău, Botoșani and Dorohoi districts. Like Enache, he had literary ambitions, and was noted as a Molière translator. Neculai's bureaucratic career was a discreet one: he was a scribe, a Pitar, an Ispravnic of Fălciu and Roman, and a Vornic at Câmpulung Moldovenesc. He pioneered the prosopography of ancient Moldavia, by financing translations from Old Church Slavonic (1750).

From Fener, Enache took to collecting and translating historiographical and juridical records of the Moldavian past. A disputed theory identifies him as the author who continued the Pseudo-Amiras manuscripts to the year 1774, which would make him Moldavia's last classical chronicler. He made a comeback to Moldavia as the Medelnicer of Prince Grigore III Ghica, witnessing Ghica's violent overthrow and decapitation, and writing about the events in two ballads. His final years were spent at Scrivulenii, thereafter known as Râpile, involved in defending the Kogălniceanu property against other claimants.

The main Kogălniceanu line was carried on by Constantin's son, Postelnic Ioan (or Ion) Kogălniceanu (1761–1800). An orphan, he was raised by the childless uncle Enache and Enache's wife Frasina, and was noted for acquiring a new family home, in the Muntenimea de Mijloc quarter of Iași. Ioan's son, Ilie (1787–1856), was a man with liberal ideas and Westernized tastes, who also played a part in the Moldavian administration apparatus and rose to the rank of Vornic. Ilie was married to Catinca Stavilla, daughter of a Romanian Bessarabian squire. Her family was reportedly Genoese, originating in Cetatea Albă but later spread throughout Bessarabia. Also orphaned, Catinca had been adopted into the Sturdza family, and was thus connected to the reigning Prince Mihail Sturdza.

== Mihail Kogălniceanu and successors ==
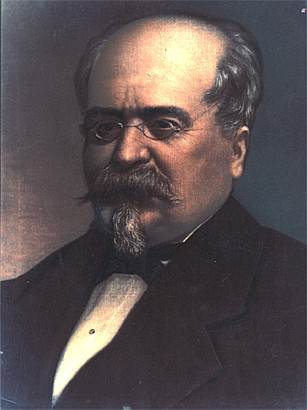
Mihail Kogălniceanu's portrait, in old age

Mihail Kogălniceanu (1817–1891), the son of Ilie and Catinca, was a leading figure in 19th-century politics, credited as one of the founders of modern Romania and of its modern liberal movement. Educated abroad, with a wide range of intellectual contributions (historiography, education, political journalism, works for the stage etc.), he openly demanded modernization and the unification of all Romanians within and without Moldavia. In youth, Kogălniceanu was doctrinaire of the 1848 Moldavian Revolution, an abortive rising against the conservative establishment of Prince Sturdza, and became a fugitive; he returned later as aide to the liberal Prince Grigore Alexandru Ghica, and engineered some of the major reforms of the 1850s, including the abolition of slavery (1855). In 1859, as an activist of the National Party, he helped bring about the Moldo-Wallachian union of 1859, and thereafter served Domnitor Alexander John Cuza as government minister. He was one of the statesmen directly involved in drafting and imposing the land reforms of the 1860s, then, as Prime Minister of Romania, helped proclaim Romanian independence (1877). He is also remembered for leading the moderate, liberal conservative, wing of the National Liberal Party, which he helped establish in 1875.

Mihail Kogălniceanu was married Ecaterina Jora (1827–1907), widow of Colonel Iorgu Scorțescu, and had at least eight children from her. The statesman's favorite was daughter Lucia (or Lucie). She had four children from her marriage to A. Vârnav-Liteanu, and two more from her second husband, Gheorghe Beldiman. Her final marriage, to Romanian dandy and Conservative Party man Leon Bogdan, produced two daughters. During and after this last marriage, she was involved in rallying support for the Conservatives and, later, the People's Party, as one of the few women of that time to openly engage in political battles; she was also a noted philanthropist. Of her progeny, daughter Lucia Vârnav-Liteanu married administrator Constantin Crupenschi. Through her son Alexandru Crupenschi's marriage with heiress Magdalena Sturdza, the Kogălniceanu descendants were intermarried with the Sturdza clan. Of Lucia Kogălniceanu's other daughters, Ana married an "Earl of Rome" (Count Russell-Killough), and Manuela a Ghica landowner.

A Conservative Party politico and notoriously rich captain of industry, Mihail's nephew Grigore Kogălniceanu (d. 1904) married Adela Cantacuzino-Pașcanu of the Cantacuzino aristocrats. She survived him by 16 years, playing the eccentric host to Iași's high society, before falling victim to an unsolved burglary-homicide in 1920.

Mihail and Ecaterina Kogălniceanu had three sons. The oldest, Constantin, was a historian and diplomat. The youngest was Vasile Kogălniceanu (1863–1942). He was an expert in agronomy, an advocate of agrarian politics, and a proponent of universal suffrage, who was jailed by the authorities as instigator of the 1907 Peasants' Revolt. Elected to Parliament with People's Party support, he played a major part in the adoption of a new and extended land reform law.

Mihail Kogălniceanu's second son, Ion (1859–1892), was the only one to leave heirs. His wife Adela, a Sturdza boyaress, gave him two children: daughter Jeanne and son Mihail. The latter is remembered for setting up, in 1935, a cultural association dedicated to the preservation of his grandfather's cultural achievements (Mihail Kogălniceanu Foundation). The venture involved other members of the family (uncles Vasile and Constantin), with noted support from literary and political figures: Nicolae Iorga, Mihail Sadoveanu, Gheorghe Tătărescu, Nicolae Titulescu, Gheorghe I. Brătianu, Ion Inculeț etc.

Mihail and his first wife Ana Leonida, a member of the aristocratic Yarka family, had a son, Ionel Kogălniceanu. From his second wife, Irina (Nineta) Duca, Mihail had Ilie Kogălniceanu, who, in 2001, was the only bearer of the Kogălniceanu surname. Both he and his mother were close to famed Romanian composer George Enescu and to Enescu's aristocratic muse Maruca Cantacuzino, both of whom lived for a while at the Kogălniceanu villa in Iași. Having authored an account of Enescu's love affair, Ilie Kogălniceanu is also known for having researched his family's history and collected various documents.
