= Arsura =

- Commune
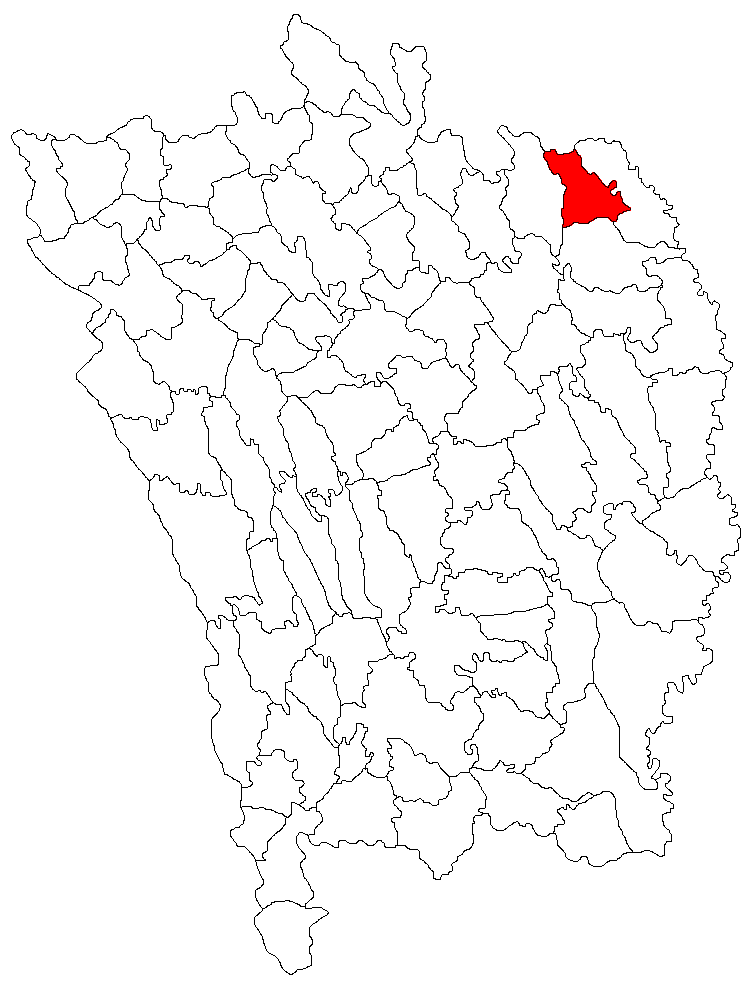
- Location in Vaslui County

- Location in Romania
- Coordinates: 46°48′48″N 28°01′20″E
- Country: Romania
- County: Vaslui
- Subdivisions: Arsura, Fundătura, Mihail Kogălniceanu, Pâhnești

Government
  - Mayor (2020–2024): Andrei-Dinu Năstase (PNL)
- Area: 40.63 km^{2} (15.69 sq mi)
- Elevation: 200 m (660 ft)
- Population (2021-12-01): 1,416
  - Density: 34.85/km^{2} (90.26/sq mi)
- Time zone: UTC+02:00 (EET)
  - Summer (DST): UTC+03:00 (EEST)
- Postal code: 737020
- Area code: +(40) 235
- Vehicle reg.: VS
- Website: www.comuna-arsura.ro

Arsura is a commune in Vaslui County, Western Moldavia, Romania. It is composed of four villages: Arsura, Fundătura, Mihail Kogălniceanu, and Pâhnești.

Mihail Kogălniceanu is commemorated in the modern name of one village.

== Natives ==
- Nicolae Gh. Lupu (1884 – 1966), physician and member of the Romanian Academy
- Nicolae L. Lupu (1876 – 1946), politician
