= Steaua Dunării =

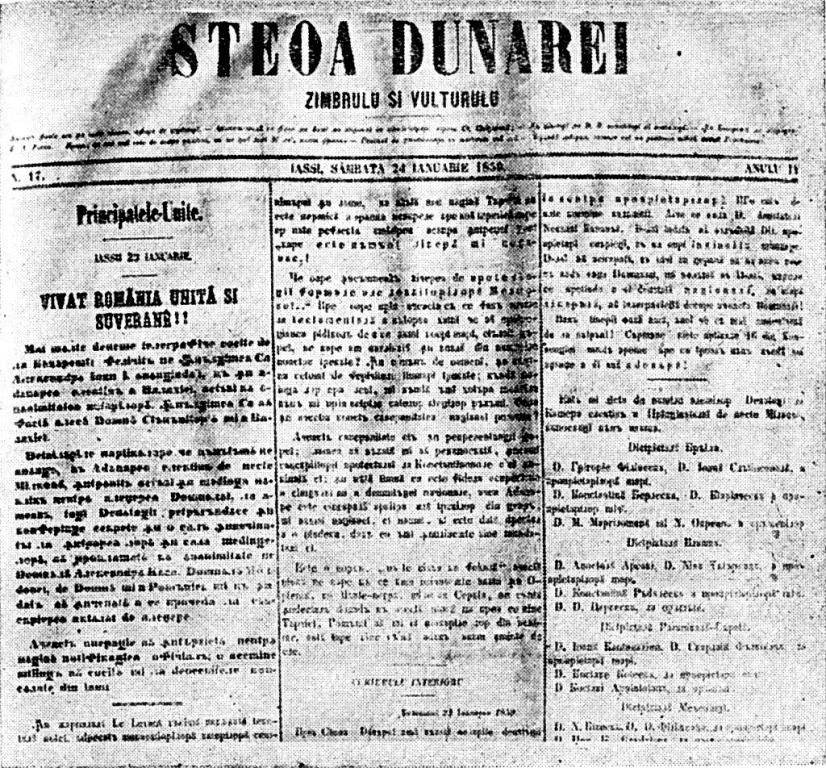
Steoa Dunărei. Zimbrulu şi Vulturulu, issue from January 24, 1859

Steaua Dunării (Danube's Star) was a political newspaper and a unionist mouthpiece founded in October 1855 by Mihail Kogălniceanu. Editors like Vasile-Urechea Avexandrescu, Vasile Mălinescu, Iancu M. Codrescu and collaborators like Vasile Alecsandri, Costache Negruzzi, Alecu Donici, Grigore Alexandrescu, Alecu Russo, Dimitrie Bolintineanu, C.A. Rosetti, Gheorghe Sion wrote articles for the newspaper.

It was closed in September 1856 because of the suspension of the press laws. It was for the first time censored in May because of a religious article.

Kogălniceanu encouraged Nicolae Ionescu to issue the magazine L'Étoile de Danube in Brussels, as a French-language version of Steaua Dunării which was published between December 1856 and May 1858 and would also serve to popularize Partida Naţională's views.

It reappeared in November 1858 and closed again in November 1860. On January 2, 1859, it merged with Zimbrul și Vulturul and was renamed Steoa Dunărei. Zimbrulu şi Vulturulu.

== Bibliography ==
- Academia Republicii Socialiste Române, Dicţionar Enciclopedic Român, volumul IV, 1966
- Predescu, Lucian, Enciclopedia României. Cugetarea, Editura Saeculum, București, 1999 ISBN 973-9399-03-7
- Răduică, Georgeta, Dicţionarul presei româneşti (1731–1918), Editura Ştiinţifică, București, ISBN 973-44-0123-8
