= Nicolae Gh. Lupu =

Romanian physician (1884–1966)

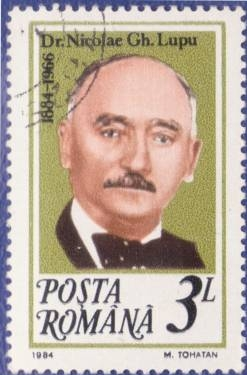
1984 stamp with Nicolae Gh. Lupu

Nicolae Gh. Lupu (24 February 1884 – 30 April 1966) was a Romanian physician. In 1948, he was elected a titular member of the Romanian Academy.

He was born in Arsura, Vaslui County, the son of a priest, Gheorghe Lupu, in a family with 10 children; his elder brother, Nicolae L. Lupu, became a politician. After completing his studies at the Faculty of Medicine of the University of Bucharest, Lupu worked from 1907 to 1913 in the experimental medicine lab of Ioan Cantacuzino. In 1931 he was appointed professor at the section of anatomical pathology of the Faculty of Medicine, and in 1936 he was named professor at Filantropia Hospital. He died in Bucharest at age 72.
