= Mircești =

- Commune
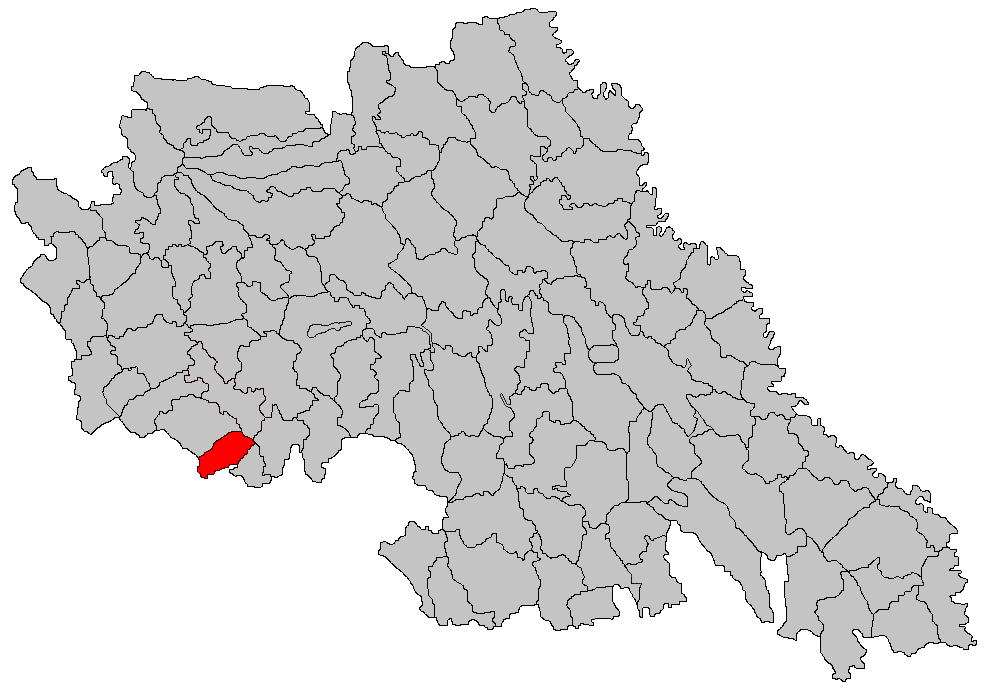
- Location in Iași County

- Location in Romania
- Coordinates: 47°4′N 26°51′E
- Country: Romania
- County: Iași
- Subdivisions: Mircești, Iugani

Government
  - Mayor (2024–2028): Leon Bălteanu (PSD)
- Area: 18.07 km^{2} (6.98 sq mi)
- Elevation: 207 m (679 ft)
- Population (2021-12-01): 3,338
  - Density: 180/km^{2} (480/sq mi)
- Time zone: EET/EEST (UTC+2/+3)
- Postal code: 707295
- Area code: +(40) x32
- Vehicle reg.: IS
- Website: mircesti.ro

Mircești is a commune in Iași County, Western Moldavia, Romania. It is composed of two villages, Iugani and Mircești. It also included the villages of Izvoarele, Răchiteni and Ursărești until 2004, when these were split off to form Răchiteni Commune.

== Notable people ==
- Vladimir Petercă (1944–2022), Roman Catholic theologian
