= Nicolae L. Lupu =

Romanian politician (1876–1947)

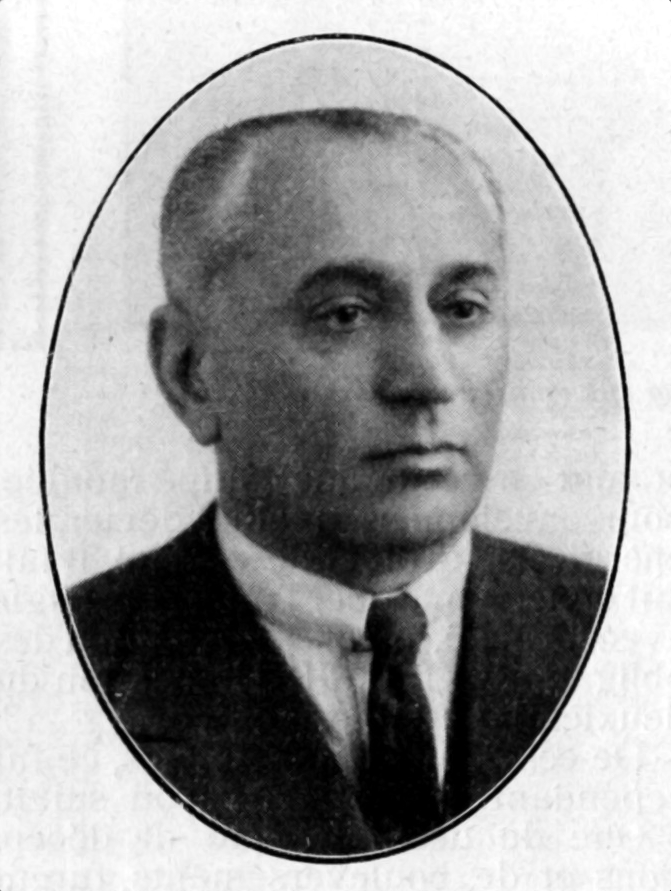
Nicolae Lupu

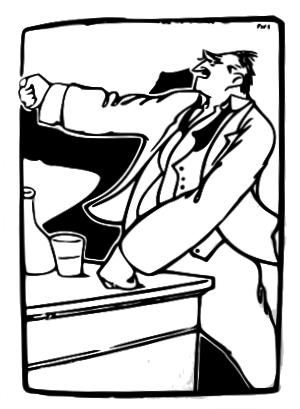
March 1922 caricature of Lupu by Victor Ion Popa

Nicolae L. Lupu (November 4, 1876 – December 4, 1946) was a Romanian left-wing politician and social physician. Originally a leader of the Labor Party, which was joined with the Peasants' Party, Lupu served as Interior Minister in 1919–1920. He formed his own Peasants' Party–Lupu in 1927, and also steered the creation of a League Against Usury; the party dissolved in 1934. His group became a dissident faction of the National Peasants' Party, and was reestablished, after World War II, as the Democratic Peasants' Party–Lupu.

He was born in Arsura, Vaslui County, the son of a priest, Gheorghe Lupu, in a family with 10 children; his younger brother, Nicolae Gh. Lupu, became a physician.
