= Vornic =

Historical Romanian title

Vornic was a historical rank for an official in charge of justice and internal affairs, who oversaw the Royal Court. The term originated from the Slovak nádvorník. In the 16th century in Moldavia there were two high vornics: one for "Ţara de Sus" (the "Upper Land"), and other for "Ţara de Jos" (the "Lower Land").
