= Dumitru C. Moruzi =

Moldavian-born Imperial Russian and Romanian aristocrat

Dumitru Constantin Moruzi Dmitry Konstantinovich Muruzi
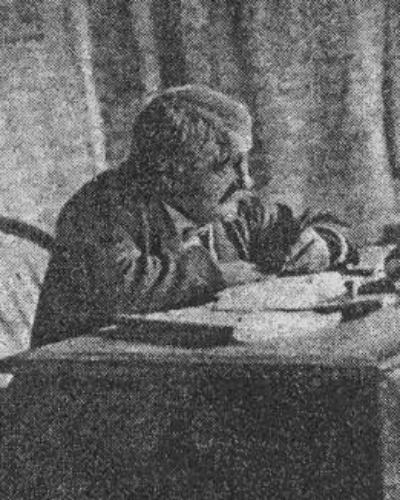
- Moruzi at his writing desk, ca. 1912
- Born: July 1, 1850; Iași, Moldavia
- Died: October 9, 1914 (aged 64); Iași, Kingdom of Romania
- Occupations: Civil servant, composer, interpreter, journalist
- Writing career
- Period: ca. 1863–1914
- Genres: Essay, social novel, historical novel, novella, memoir, satire, lyric poetry
- Literary movement: Neoclassicism, Sămănătorul

Dumitru Constantin Moruzi (also known as Dimitrie Moruzi or Moruzzi; Russian: Дмитрий Константинович Мурузи, Dmitry Konstantinovich Muruzi; July 1 or 2, 1850 – October 9, 1914) was a Moldavian-born Imperial Russian and Romanian aristocrat, civil servant, and writer. A scion of the prestigious Mourousis and Sturdza families, he was the son of adventurer Constantin D. Moruzi, who had switched his allegiance between Moldavia, Russia, and the United Principalities. Dumitru's uncle was Alexandru "Alecu" Moruzi, who briefly led the Moldavian government, while his first cousin, Natalia Keșco was for a while queen of Serbia. Dumitru was also the maternal uncle of historian Gheorghe I. Brătianu.

As a French-trained man of letters, Moruzi held office with the Russian military bureaucracy during the Turkish War of 1877. Against his father's Russophilia, he opted for Romanian nationalism and, in the process, lost his family estates in Bessarabia. He emigrated to the newly formed Kingdom of Romania and took up Romanian nationality in the 1880s. He then helped administer Northern Dobruja—playing an important part in the modernization of Sulina, and also in the ethnic colonization of the region.

It was also in Sulina that Moruzi contracted illnesses which eventually left him deaf and bedridden. Financially destitute, he tried to earn his living as an opera composer, before becoming a journalist. Moruzi began writing analyses of Tsarist autocracy during the Russian Revolution of 1905, when he asserted that the multinational empire would crumble along ethnic lines. These serialized essays slowly earned the attention and enthusiasm of more prominent nationalists, including historian Nicolae Iorga. The latter brought Moruzi into contact with his Sămănătorist circle, hosting his memoirs and articles in Neamul Românesc and Unirea, and welcoming him into the ranks of the Democratic Nationalist Party.

Moruzi's main literary contributions are social novels, fictionalizing his family history and, overall, the shared destiny of Bessarabian elites. Such works blend a message of nationalism and conservatism, which veers into antisemitism and anti-Masonry, with the classical tradition of storytelling. They were circulated among Romanian intellectuals on both sides of the border and earned critical accolades, but failed to make a significant impact on culture. Posthumously censored in both Communist Romania and the Soviet Union, Moruzi was recovered after 1993, being recognized as an early contributor to both Romanian and Moldovan literature.

== Biography ==
=== Origins and childhood ===
Dumitru Moruzi belonged to the Mourousis family, which formed part of a wave of Greek immigrants to Moldavia; integrated by the local aristocracy, or boyardom, they had originated in the Empire of Trebizond and settled in Istanbul in the 17th century. He was a direct descendant of Phanariote royalty, his great-great-grandfather, Constantine Mourousis, having served as Prince of Moldavia in 1777–1782. Constantine's first-born son Alexander also rose to that position, and briefly took the princely throne of Wallachia. Both he and his father were intellectuals and modernizers, with Alexander remembered as one of the founders of Romanian Freemasonry and a sponsor of Neoclassical architecture.

Alexander's brother was the Beizadea Dimitrie, who served as Dragoman of the Ottoman Empire, and helped draft the Bucharest treaty of 1812. Through it, Moldavia ceded Bessarabia to the Russian Empire—an episode which seemingly pointed to Dimitrie's divided loyalties. His failure to protect Ottoman interests resulted in his hanging by the Janissaries of Shumla. In 1820, the office of Dragoman was held by his nephew Constantine, similarly executed for failing to denounce his friends in the Filiki Eteria. The family had to flee Ottoman territory, including the Danubian Principalities, after several of its members fought in the Greek War of Independence. They became Russian nationals, but managed to preserve their Moldavian estates by subterfuge—formally passing them to a branch of the Rosetti family. A claim to the Moldavian inheritance was stated by one of Dumitru's paternal uncles, Alexandru "Alecu" Moruzi (c. 1815–1878), who married a daughter of Hatman Răducanu Ruset (Rosetti). Historian and polemicist Mihail Kogălniceanu argued that, by 1861, the family was still entirely Greek, their Rosetti connection being a "weak foundation" for their claims to Moldavian roots. Also according to Kogălniceanu, in the 1830s the Moruzis had Russian passports, with Alecu asking to be addressed by a non-Moldavian title, as Knyaz Moruzi.

Dumitru's father, Constantin Moruzi (1816–1886), or Costache Moruz Pecheanu, was an officer of the Hellenic Navy. He had a son by his first wife, Pulheria Cantacuzino: Russian diplomat Alexandru C. Moruzi (1842–1900). Constantin had inherited estates in both Moldavia and Wallachia, including Făurei, Vrancea County. Attracted to liberal ideas, he had reportedly tried to manumit his Romani slaves, but was forced to rescind when they rebelled. The Romanies were organized into a private army, which, in 1846, prepared to march on Iași against the reigning Moldavian Prince, Mihail Sturdza. Later, the Moruzi brothers participated in the Moldavian Revolution of 1848, with Constantin personally meeting Prince Sturdza to hand him the letter signed by hundreds of protesters. Alecu was swiftly arrested and deported to the Danube Vilayet; Constantin became an outlaw and was widely suspected of collecting another private army, before being captured and expelled to Russia. A colorful character, he once appeared in Spanish costume on the balcony of an Odessa hotel, proclaiming himself the last descendant of Trebizond's emperors. He declared that a man as handsome as he only appeared once a century.

Moruzi family coat of arms, featuring the eagle of Russia and the Moldavian aurochs

Returning home in the 1850s, Constantin married a second time, to Princess Ecaterina Sturdza. This granddaughter of Prince Ioan Sturdza was reportedly very ugly but also highly intelligent and energetic; she was Dumitru's mother. Born in Iași, Dumitru spent his first four years at Făurei, which he later declared to be his favorite place in the world. During that interval, his father became rivals with Prince Grigore Alexandru Ghica. Still holding Russian citizenship, he may have acted as a Russian agent of influence in Moldavia. In 1854, at the height of the Crimean War, Constantin and his family crossed from Moldavia-proper into Bessarabia (by then a Russian governorate). This was done upon orders from the Austrian occupation authorities, on a request from the Ottoman army, or, alternatively, from Prince Ghica himself. In the 1860s, Constantin was directly involved in Russian censorship of Moldavian liberal newspapers and magazines.

In March 1857, following the death of Caimacam Teodor Balș, Alecu Moruzi was credited with real chances of succeeding him as Prince, but the regency was prolonged, and went to Nicolae Vogoride. According to Kogălniceanu, Alecu was an absentee landlord and an apolitical figure throughout most of the decade, before finally taking a seat in the 1858 Assembly; other accounts suggest that he had rallied with the National Party, before becoming a civilian administrator of Galați. The other Moruzis returned to Moldavia during the same period, while Moldavia was merging with Wallachia into the United Principalities—however, they still commuted to Bessarabia, where they now owned the estate of Dănuțeni. Like his brother, Constantin supported the National Party, becoming friends with its candidate for princely office, Alexandru Ioan Cuza.

=== Exile and return ===
Knyaz Alecu, meanwhile, briefly headed the Moldavian government and preserved his seat in the Assembly—though his eligibility, including his citizenship, was openly questioned by Kogălniceanu. The latter eventually engineered the cabinet's downfall. Alecu then served on the first unified government of Romania as Minister of Finance, but resigned after only a few days. He joined other boyars in resisting Cuza and Kogălniceanu's land reform project, favoring a more conservative proposal also advanced in Parliament by Dimitrie Ghica and Apostol Arsache. Alecu mounted the boyars' last stand, to the point of asking for mediation by Austria. He had four children who married into Russian and European aristocracy, including Maria, who wed Cuza's son, the pretender Alexandru "Sașa" Cuza. She was later married for just one day to the Romanian politico Ion I. C. Brătianu, birthing his son, the historian Gheorghe I. Brătianu.

Cuza and the Moruzis disagreed on agrarian issues, but remained close on other points of policy. Alecu signed his name to various acts strengthening the Moldo–Wallachian union, and, a strong proponent of free trade, served on the board of Romania Bank. In early 1866, he was tipped to succeed Nicolae Kretzulescu as Prime Minister of Romania, in what was supposed to be a "Russophile" cabinet. This plan crumbled the same year, with the rise of an anti-Cuza "monstrous coalition", which deposed the Domnitor. Later that year, the Moruzis switched their allegiance to Moldavian separatism. Most controversially, both brothers instigated, with Calinic Miclescu, the Moldavian separatist riots. Unwelcome in Romania, from 1869 Constantin was recognized as a Knyaz and received into Russian nobility, serving terms as deputy in the Zemstvo of Bălți County, where he supported Bessarabian autonomism. The Bessarabian Moruzis sponsored literary gatherings, musical parties, and charities, and, in the 1870s, played host to the novelist Olga Nacu.

Dumitru spent the remainder of his childhood in Kishinev (Chișinău) and on his father's estates of Cosăuți and Ciripcău, both in the vicinity of Soroca. His mother taught him elementary notions of mathematics, literature and French grammar, awakening an appreciation for Molière, Pierre Corneille and Jean Racine. He learned Russian followed by French, with his formal education beginning at Iași. As a youth, he traveled and got to know major cities of the Empire, including Saint Petersburg, Moscow, and Kiev. He was charmed by Odessa, where he arrived upon the invitation of his maternal aunt, Profirița Moruzi-Keșco. Some of his first literary attempts are verses written in honor of that city. Profirița died soon after, leaving her daughter Natalia Keșco to be raised by Constantin and Ecaterina, as Dumitru and Alexandru's stepsister.

In 1863, Moruzi was sent to the Lycée Saint-Louis in Paris. He probably attended a military academy or the Sorbonne afterwards, returning to Bessarabia in 1869 as a Francophile. In 1873, encouraged by his father, he entered service with the marshal of nobility for the Soroca district. In 1875, he and his family became in-laws of the Obrenović dynasty which ruled the Principality of Serbia: through Constantin Moruzi's intercession, Natalia married Milan I, from 1882 the King of Serbia. At the time, his uncle Alecu was serving in the Romanian Assembly of Deputies, where he sided, albeit conditionally, with the conservative majority.

From 1877, Dumitru became an interpreter for the diplomatic service of the Russian Empire. In this capacity, he accompanied Russian troops onto various battlefields in Rumelia during the Russo-Turkish War of 1877–1878. In early 1878, he had moved to Köstence, in Russian-occupied Northern Dobruja. He was then sent to undertake diplomatic work in the Romanian capital Bucharest. There, in April 1878, he entered a joint commission for analyzing protests by Romanian civilians against Russian troops transiting the country, sitting for over a year until the group was dissolved. In December, Domnitor Carol I awarded him the Order of the Star of Romania. In addition, he received the Order of the Cross of Takovo from Milan I and the Order of Saint Alexander from Alexander I of Bulgaria. Moruzi alienated his parents when he refused to become a diplomat like his half-brother, turning to Romanian nationalism and campaigning for Bessarabia's incorporation into the new Kingdom of Romania. He also married, against Constantin's will, to a French governess he met in Bessarabia. She gave birth to a son. The three left Russia for good and settled in Bucharest, obtaining Romanian citizenship in 1882 or 1883. By then, Alexander II of Russia had ordered him stripped of his Russian citizenship and, technically, of his right to inherit.

=== Sulina and literary debut ===
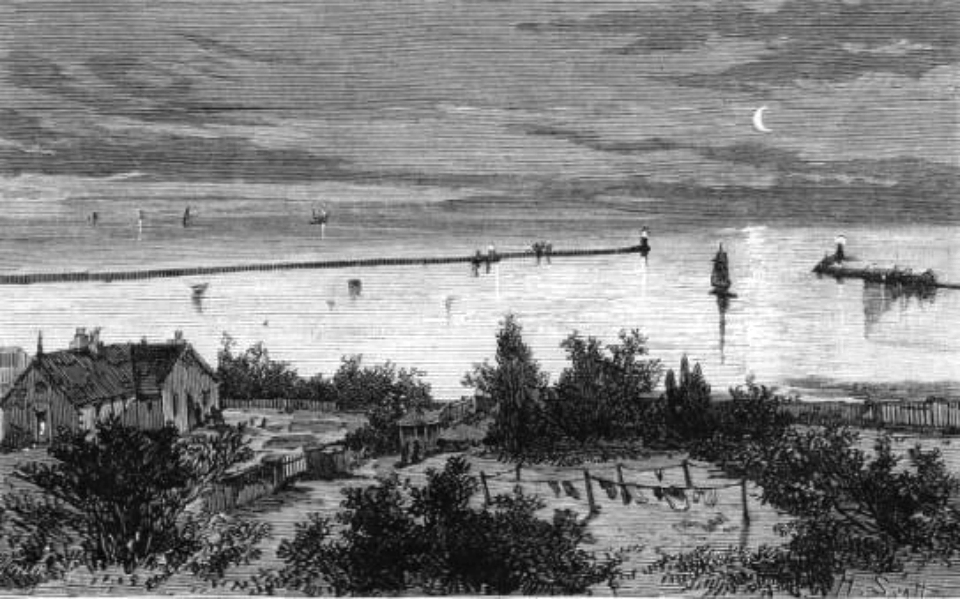
Sulina in 1877 (Le Monde Illustré engraving)

Moruzi, who bragged about having thus "spurned a fortune worth more than two million", was soon after named administrator of Constanța County, returning to what was by then Romanian Northern Dobruja. He helped build roads, schools and churches, also organizing a notary service and naming Romanian mayors. According to his own statement, he also helped with the Romanianization of "assimilable" Greeks and Bulgarians, and unofficially colonized the area with Wallachians. This work was covered in 1886 by the daily România Liberă, which called him a "good administrator", but, as Moruzi complained, it was eventually overturned by his successor Vasile Kogălniceanu.

In June 1887, Moruzi was named administrator and deputy prefect at the Port of Sulina, in the Danube Delta, taking anti-flood measures and organizing a volunteer fire brigade on the Austrian model. He devoted special attention to a high school for musicians, helped build a theater and repair the local church, and introduced lectures in nationalism at the local Philharmonic Society, which he had established. Moruzi's political focus also meant taking steps to "assimilate all who are assimilable." His children's orchestra, for which he provided clothes and food, was under a Czech Kapellmeister. By his own account, he had to tolerate the Lipovans, who had selected as their physician an undertrained Russian political exile, Peter "Doctor Petru" Alexandrov, and who rarely reported deaths in the community. His own tackling of the cholera pandemic, which reached Sulina in 1892, was described as incompetent by an anonymous whistleblower with the initials "P. A.". According to this source, Moruzi had never modernized the latrines of his very own administrative palace, and never sanitized the drinking water, instead spending money on "fanciful products"—including the theater, but also "empty cabins on the seashore".

Constantin Moruzi died at Odessa while playing cards, and was buried at Dănuțeni, while Ecaterina is buried in Sulina. In mid-1895, Dumitru's half-brother Alexandru visited Sulina and spent three weeks there; rumors in the press had it that two frigates of the Imperial Russian Navy had guarded the port throughout that interval. By then, Dumitru's work in administration was threatened by the intrigues of a National Liberal Party politico, Eugeniu Stătescu, who wanted him demoted. When a change in government portended a demotion and transfer to Măcin, Dumitru resigned from the civil service. A difficult period followed, particularly as he had spent much of the 250,000 gold lei left by his mother. In 1897, when he was living on Zimbrului Street in Galați, he sued one of the local pawn brokers, claiming that he had been cheated out of 40,956 lei. Moruzi had by then married and divorced Teresa z Giżyckich (or Gizyka), who wrote a biography of Moruzi where she describes his affair with another woman. She eventually joined the Sisters of the Holy Family of Nazareth in Wadowice.

The Knyaz himself withdrew to a one-room, unfurnished, apartment on Dealul Spirii, trying his hand at becoming a composer. Moruzi's comic opera in three acts, Pescariĭ din Sulina ("Fishermen of Sulina"), was performed at the National Theater Bucharest in February 1902. It was poorly reviewed by journalist Emil Fagure, who noted that it had overall the quality of a café-chantant, and that Petre Liciu, cast as a Jewish stereotype, could not hope to rescue the performance. By 1903, Moruzi's last hope of being hired lay in Natalia's son, King Alexander of Serbia, but the latter was assassinated that year. Natalia bought him a house in the Tătărași quarter of Iași, located just outside Eternitatea cemetery. At that point, he had to earn a living by writing—a practice he took up not just out of obligation, but also out of a sense of duty to keep alive a vanished world. According to the journalist Corneliu Carp, although an "infirm", his early years in Tătărași, "one of [Iași's] more pleasant" suburbs, were serene and "almost monastic". Yet, "nobody knows the goings-on of his life, not even his well-off relatives with their rightful princely splendor; only now and then do young students visit him, keen on learning from his sweet elderly voice the stories of his parents' Bessarabia."

As Moruzi aged, diseases that appeared during his Delta days worsened, and he gradually lost hearing, being also beset by money troubles. He began an intense work in journalism with Basarabia și viitorul ei 1812–1905 ("Bessarabia and Her Future 1812–1905"), first published in the Cronica newspaper from February 1905, and in book form later that year. Prompted by the Russian Revolution of January, Moruzi speculated that Russia would crumble, leading to the emancipation of Poland-Lithuania or to an independent "Little Russia", but stated that "it is certainly not my intention to promote Romanian irredentism". Nonetheless, he urged Bessarabian Romanians to take up "productive labor" and "rekindle the Bessarabian genius". He also castigated the Romanian state for not having distributed propaganda in the region, noting that Bessarabia and Romania were separated by a "great wall". This text was followed the same year by a series of articles titled Rușii ("Russians"). The collection Rușii și românii ("Russians and Romanians", 1906) was prefaced by the influential historian Nicolae Iorga, and circulated clandestinely among Bessarabian intellectuals.

=== The "sociological" novelist ===
Iorga, who expressed fascination for Moruzi's "sharp intelligence", maintained his association with the Bessarabian into the next decade. On Iorga's encouragement, Moruzi began writing memoirs and literary fragments for the newspaper Unirea, and for its literary supplement. According to the writer's own account, Iorga's patronage made his Moruzi relatives aware that he was not "a nincompoop and an embarrassment", and prompted them to provide him with a pension. He joined Iorga's Democratic Nationalist Party (PND) upon its creation in 1910, but refused to read the statutes, simply believing them consonant with his own brand of nationalism. He remained critical of anti-elitist factions within the PND; seen by historian Florin Marinescu as a "staunch antisemite", Moruzi declared that "the job of playing off classes against each other should be left to kikes and socialists". He also proposed the creation of a "Christian Masonry" to counter the influence of actual Freemasons.

Published by the literary press of the PND's Neamul Românesc, Moruzi's main works are Înstrăinații. Studiu social în formă de roman ("Alienated People. A Social Study in the Shape of a Novel", 1910) and Pribegi în țară răpită. Roman social basarabean ("Outcasts in the Stolen Land. A Bessarabian Social Novel", 1912). As Moruzi himself explained, the writings were not to be read as novels, but as documents; to his supporters, he was a "thinker and sociologist". Iorga himself recommended Moruzi, alongside Henri Stahl, Romulus Cioflec and Ion Agârbiceanu, as a canon of traditionalist writing in prose at Neamul Românesc. As noted in 2015 by critic Răzvan Voncu, such standards make Moruzi a latecomer to Iorga's Sămănătorist movement. Nevertheless, Moruzi complained privately that Neamul Românesc was censoring his calls for class collaboration, and also his outbursts against the socialists at Facla.

The protagonists of Înstrăinații are his father Constantin, appearing as boyar Agapie Varlaam, and Dimitrie himself—here named Artur. The story covers the events of 1848 and 1854, but is mainly noted for its glimpses of high-society life in Bessarabia and Moldavia at large. In its opening manifesto, the book described the dangers of Russification and Francization, particularly among the upper classes—the peasants, Moruzi noted, were still Romanian in language and customs, whereas Bessarabian boyars are shown disregarding their mother tongues for prestige languages. Other parts of the book, showing debates between the Varlaams and Prince Ghica or Alexandru Ioan Cuza, take a more conservative stance, insisting upon class collaboration; the narrator praises Carol and Lascăr Catargiu for having found and preserved a moderate course.

Irredentist coat of arms of Bessarabia stamped with the Steel Crown of Romania, as depicted on the cover of Pribegi în țară răpită, 1912

Pribegi în țară răpită was written with noted documentary contributions by Ion Pelivan, the Bessarabian activist. It is, in part, an answer to Pavel Krushevan's own novel, Millions, and a homage to Bessarabia on the centennial of her incorporation into Russia. The Moruzis, including Dumitru's brother Alexandru, appear as the Mavrocosta clan, and the novel delves into their political convictions and intimate affairs. The book also fictionalizes events relating to the Keșcos and Bessarabian anarchist Zamfir Arbore; the latter had been acquainted with, and protected by, the author's father. Constantin Moruzi appears both as himself and as the Mavrocosta patriarch (the two are brothers-in-law). Here, Russification is depicted in more serious tones, having led to the wholesale import of customs and created new pidgin dialects. Mavrocosta finds himself torn between his loyalty to Russia and his Moldavian patriotism. The author's conservatism is again on display, targeting revolutionary ideologies. For instance, Moruzi praises the rationality and ethos of social democracy, opposing them to Russian nihilism.

In addition to Iorga, Moruzi's writings also drew notice from A. D. Xenopol and Gheorghe Cardaș, who welcomed his affection for Bessarabia and its past, as well as for nature. Radu Rosetti, Iorga's rival at Viața Romînească, also acknowledged Moruzi as a "writer of talent", his technique "clear and beautiful". According to Eugen Lovinescu, Moruzi and Rosetti alike were in a line of great Moldavian raconteurs, alongside Gheorghe Sion. Critic Mariana Conta-Kernbach praises Moruzi's "flowing and somber style", listing him as one of the neo-classicists in succession to his father's revolutionary-and-optimistic generation. George Călinescu only wrote a brief note about him, setting down an incorrect birth year; Petre V. Haneș, in his 1942 study of Bessarabian writers, devotes much more ample space to analyzing the works of Moruzi. Other commentators note that his novels in particular have a certain Russian influence, probably from the author's reading of Ivan Turgenev and Leo Tolstoy. Ideology seeps into Pribegi în țară răpită and, prompting literary historian Gheorghe Bezviconi to suggest that its "useless, entirely valueless, dialogues" be stripped from future editions. According to Bezviconi, the more descriptive parts are "exquisite". Contrarily, Lovinescu assesses that, in Moruzi's work, fiction was "kept to a minimum, and it is actually the only aspect that annoys the reader." Voncu also argues that "although not a great literary talent, [Moruzi] was a cultural and political consciousness."

=== Final years ===
Moruzi's other writings covered various genres, including samples of Sămănătorist poetry. A three-act comedy, its title unknown, was published in 1911, around the same time as a satirical novella, Pe viscol ("During Blizzard"). The latter showed the prevarications of a boyar who switches from liberalism to conservatism at his own convenience. A "moral study" with a prologue and three acts, Sărutarea lui Iuda sau Iuda în casă de boier, Iuda la sat, Iuda în Capitală și Iuda parvenit ("Judas' Kiss or Judas in a Boyar Dwelling, Judas in the Villages, Judas in the Capital and Judas as Parvenu") appeared in 1912. The same year, which marked a century of Russian administration in Bessarabia, he published a book called Basarabia noastră and a collection of folk songs, Cântece basarabene. He involved himself in public polemics, as for instance upon Alexandrov's death and burial in August 1911. He declared himself outraged that the Romanian Orthodox Church had allowed Alexandrov's "civil funeral" to take place in a Christian cemetery, and expressed additional consternation that Bessarabians Arbore and Constantin Stere had agreed to attend.

Introduced as a "university professor", Moruzi also joined the Iași Committee which prepared the commemoration of Bessarabia's annexation; his colleagues there were Xenopol, Stere, Corneliu Șumuleanu, and Unirea's A. C. Cuza. The group, acting in unison with the Cultural League for the Unity of All Romanians, invited all Romanians to fly the Romanian tricolor and the "Bessarabian red-on-blue flag", both with the black stripes of mourning. Also then, Moruzi was involved in a dialogue with Russian historian Nikolai Nikolayevich Durnovo, father of the linguist. Durnovo had written favorably of Romanian nationalism, trying to obtain Romania's support for a looming war between Russia and the Triple Alliance; he was also proposing the partition of Bessarabia and Bukovina between the two allied nations. Moruzi, who believed that Durnovo spoke for the Russian Government, welcomed the change of policy. He acknowledged that a liberal Russia was a comfortable ally for Romania, but asked for guarantees that Russian imperialism would be curbed. He also accused Durnovo of hypocrisy, noting that Bessarabia was not traditionally Russian, but had been colonized with "Khokhols". He therefore rejected partition on principle.

As Iorga recalled, both of Moruzi's novels were accomplished and "vibrated youthful, brave, nationalism", but were also "hardly ever picked up and read". According to critic Radu Dragnea, Moruzi did not fit the stylistic mold of the 1910s, "as if there is no literature out there for him to acknowledge"; also, according to Carp, the Knyaz detested the work of Romanian Symbolists, showing in this similarities with traditionalists such as Ion Gorun, George Panu, and Mihail Sadoveanu. Dragnea therefore concluded that Moruzi "does not write for us, his contemporaries, who aren't satisfied with anything [...]. His entire work will stand as a precious document in days to come". While repeatedly refusing to write an actual autobiography, Moruzi had begun work on Moartea lui Cain ("Death of Cain"), which was only published posthumously. In some ways a sequel to Înstrăinații, it details the peasants' revolt of 1907. In March 1914, Moruzi returned to antisemitic themes, contributing to the polemic on Jewish emancipation with the article Problema jidovească și poporul român ("The Jewish Question and the Romanian People"). Defining himself as a "humble autodidact", Moruzi argued that Romanian Jews were less qualified for citizenship than ethnic Romanians from outside the Kingdom. He called naturalization on such grounds "false, unnatural and alien". That summer, Unirea published his column on the styling of Romanian nobility, in which Moruzi protested against boyars who took up "foreign titles".

Living in near-total isolation after going deaf ("the cruelest of all infirmities", as he defined it), Moruzi was also succumbing to asthma. He still followed political events during the earliest stages of World War I, when Romania chose neutrality. In one of his final contributions, published as an Evenimentul op-ed in July 1914, Moruzi asked that the country independently declare war on Austria-Hungary, in order to both assert its territorial demands and spite Russia. He died in poverty at Iași, in October 1914, but had a sumptuous funeral at Eternitatea, where his friend Cuza delivered a eulogy. Cuza referred to Moruzi as a "man of generous vision [and] honestly nationalist ideas", arguing that his worldview was shaped by "the truth of Christian teachings" and by a commitment to the Romanian Orthodox Church. In his obituary piece, Iorga also noted that Moruzi was an example to follow, but also a remainder of his age, the age "when youth could only be found among the sexagenarians and when those working for the nation, unrewarded, were those beset by fatal illness and the poorest among the poor".

== Legacy ==
Knyaz Dumitru was only survived by his son, who lived in Paris as "Prince Mourousi" and, Iorga notes, maintained an extravagant lifestyle. The Russian Revolution of February 1917 brought about Bessarabian autonomy, consecrated as the "Moldavian Democratic Republic". During the October Revolution, which made possible the union of Bessarabia with Romania, Pelivan, by then a leader of the National Moldavian Party, paid public homage to Moruzi. In his speech before Sfatul Țării, he referred to Pribegi în țară răpită as "something of a Moldavian gospel." In June 1925, a delegation of Bessarabian cultural societies tended to Moruzi's grave and deposited wreaths. In 1936, however, Pelivan's former colleague, Emanoil Catelli, suggested that Moruzi had betrayed the Bessarabian unionist cause with his departure for Romania, having "capitulated before his fight had even begun". According to literary critic Alexandru Piru, Stere was inspired by Moruzi in writing his own Bessarabian-themed, autobiographical novels of the 1920s.

The Soviet occupation of Bessarabia, then the impact of World War II, returned him to near-complete anonymity: Moruzi was indexed and censored in both Communist Romania and the Moldovan SSR. As noted by Voncu: "Romanian communists cast a prohibition on Dumitru C. Moruzi's writings because these obsessed with the Bessarabian question and Russia's shameless behavior. For the 'Moldovenists' of Chișinău, Dumitru C. Moruzi was twice the adversary: on one hand, he was 'the boyar', a hobbyhorse of communist propaganda, and, on the other, one who supported the notion that Bessarabia was eminently Romanian." Reassessment followed the dissolution of the Soviet Union, particularly so in independent Moldova. In 2001, Iurie Colesnic put out a new edition of Rușii și românii, the first of several such books issued in a "Testament Collection" at Museum publishing house. As early as 1993, philologists Vasile Ciocanu and Andrei Hropotinschi prepared a collected works edition; it only saw print in 2014, by which time both scholars were dead.
