= Bărboi Monastery =

Heritage site in Iași, Romania

Coordinates: 47.1628046°N 27.5931125°E

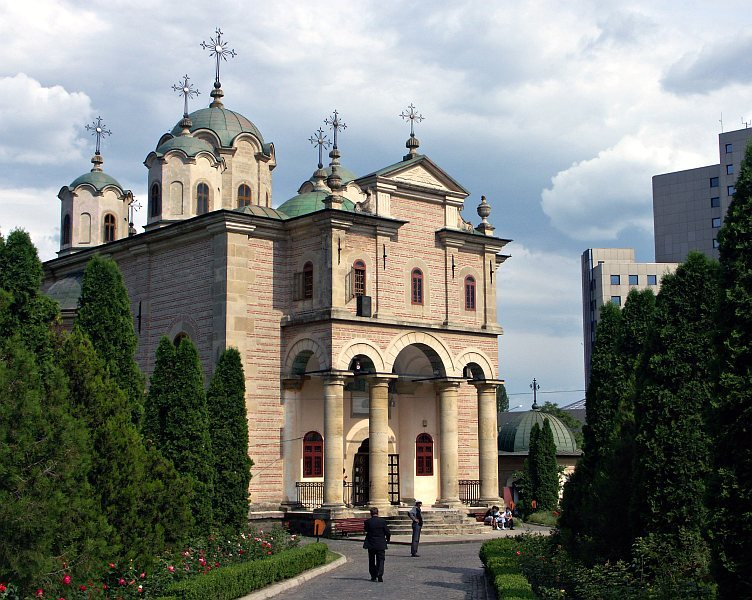
- Façade

Religion
- Affiliation: Romanian Orthodox Church

Location
- Location: Iași, Romania
- Interactive map of Bărboi Monastery

Architecture
- Architect: Andrei Caridi
- Style: Byzantine layout, Neoclassical elements
- Groundbreaking: 1841
- Completed: 1843
- Materials: stone, brick

The Bărboi Monastery (Romanian: Mănăstirea Bărboi), dedicated to Saints Peter and Paul, is a Romanian Orthodox monastery located at 12 Bărboi Street, Iași, Romania.

== History ==
The current church was raised on the foundation of a church built in 1613–15, dedicated to Saint Paraschiva and commissioned by the vornic Ioan Ursu Bărboi. In 1669, this church became a monastery under the authority of Vatopedi monastery on Mount Athos. The church was seriously damaged in 1821 and demolished in 1829. Between 1841 and 1843, the logofăt Dimitrie Sturdza and his family members, with financial assistance from Vatopedi and the efforts of Metropolitan Grigore Irinopoleos, had the current church built on the site of the old one. The architect Andrei Caridi was assisted by the Greek master builders Atanasie and Gheorghe. The resulting church resembles certain Athonite buildings in form and dimension, and is the city's only church in the shape of a Greek cross.

The church was shaken by the 1977 earthquake, and from 1980–88, the exterior was restored and the interior paintings and furnishings cleaned. Metropolitan Teoctist Arăpașu began this project, and on 27 November 1988, by then Patriarch of All Romania, he re-consecrated the church. The Bărboi Monastery is listed in the National Register of Historic Monuments.

Today, in addition to hosting religious services, the church is the headquarters of the local branch of the Romanian Orthodox Women's Society and of the Romanian Orthodox Brotherhood; the latter undertakes philanthropic and cultural activities. Art exhibitions, awards ceremonies, book signings and similar activities take place on the premises. Moreover, every Lazarus Saturday since 1990, thousands of pilgrims have gathered at the church, carrying icons of Christ and making their way toward the Metropolitan Cathedral. The church once again became a monastery in 2023.

== Style ==
The church is rectangular in plan and made of valuable stone blocks alternating with rows of brick. To the east, north and south, there are small semicircular apses beneath the top of the walls, flanked by pilasters that rest on bases. The wide central dome, with Neo-Gothic and Romanesque elements, sits above a square base and is surrounded by four much smaller domes with octagonal bases. The main entrance features an imposing portal held up by eight Doric columns. Above this is a classical facade that also features Doric columns.

The church's spacious Byzantine interior is composed of three naves: a central one and two lateral ones, divided by columns of Carrara marble topped by Corinthian capitals. Looking inside, a harmony of arches can be observed: each pair of columns is linked by two or even four arches in perfect symmetry. The iconostasis is carved from wood and gilt. The walls are covered in paintings of saints (including military ones), Biblical scenes, the Madonna and Child and the Four Evangelists.

An inscribed tablet records various phases in the church's history. Inside is the crypt of the noble Sturdza family (which includes the grave of Prince Ioan Sturdza), bathed in candlelight, next to the poet Alecu Russo. The Bărboi Church is also where writer Ion Creangă served as deacon and lived in the parish house from 1863–65.

The bell tower, built in 1726–33 by masons from Padua, has four levels; clocks rest in the uppermost one (uniquely for the city) and bells in the middle two. The lowest level has an exterior of quality stone, well worked and preserved; the other levels have a plaster exterior. It is through the lowest level that one enters the church grounds; the gate is made of decorated cast iron. The tower once contained the library of the writer Costache Conachi.

The 19th-century parish house is based on traditional Moldavian monastic houses. It has two floors and a simple plan, with rooms arranged symmetrically about a central hallway. Starting in 1834, it housed Moldavia's first girls' school, founded by Mihail Sturdza.

== Gallery ==
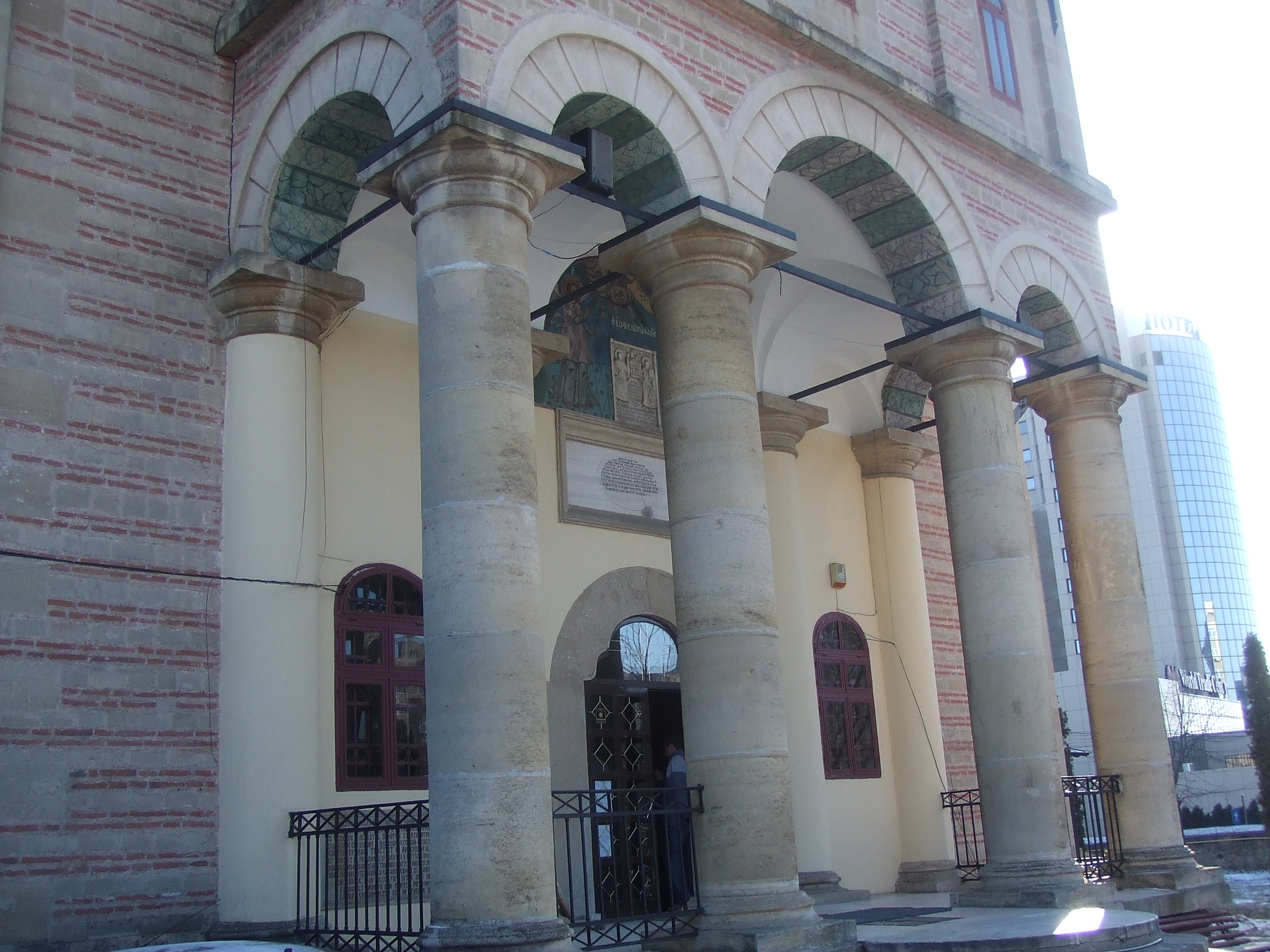
Main entrance

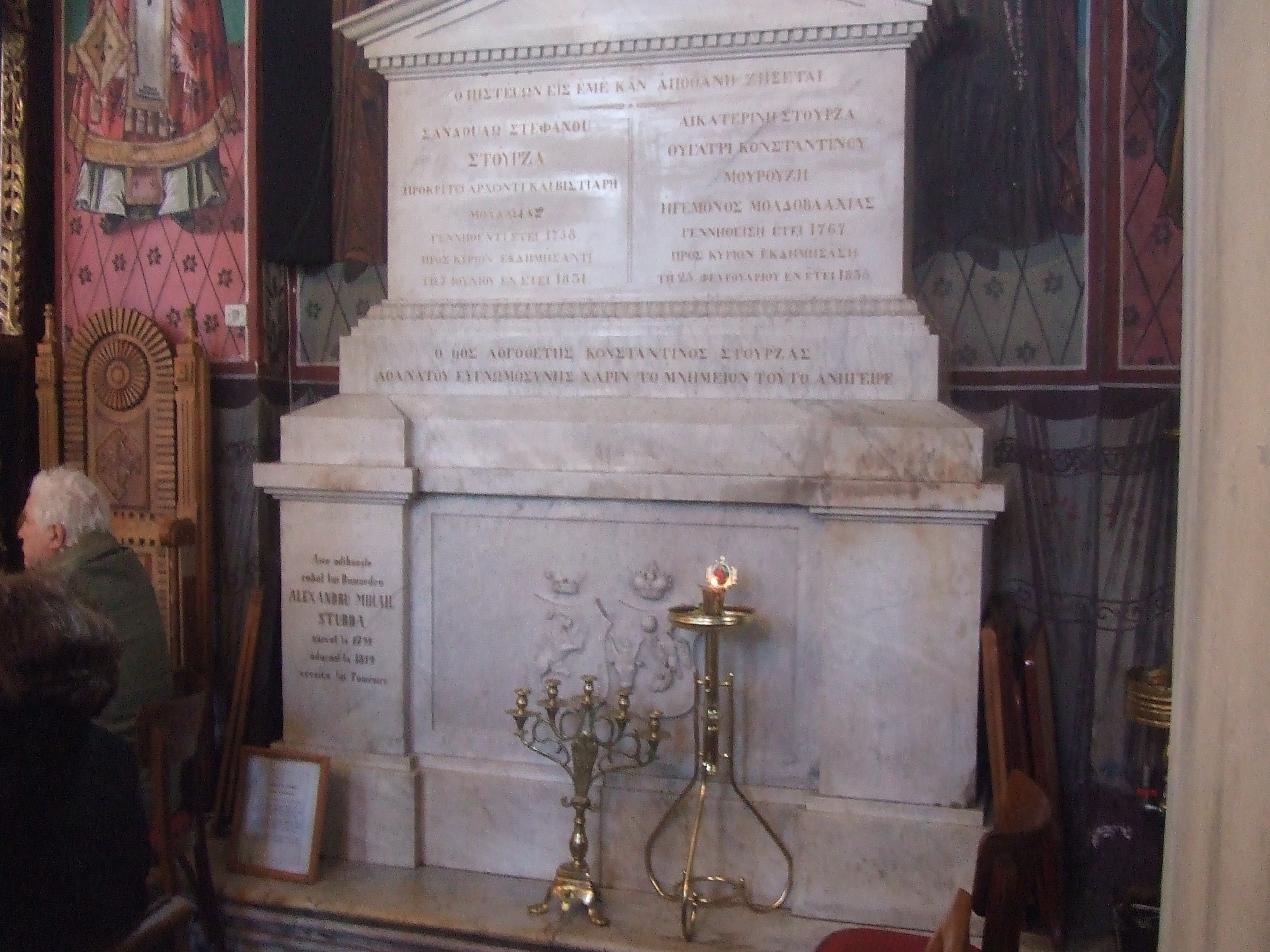
Sturdza monument

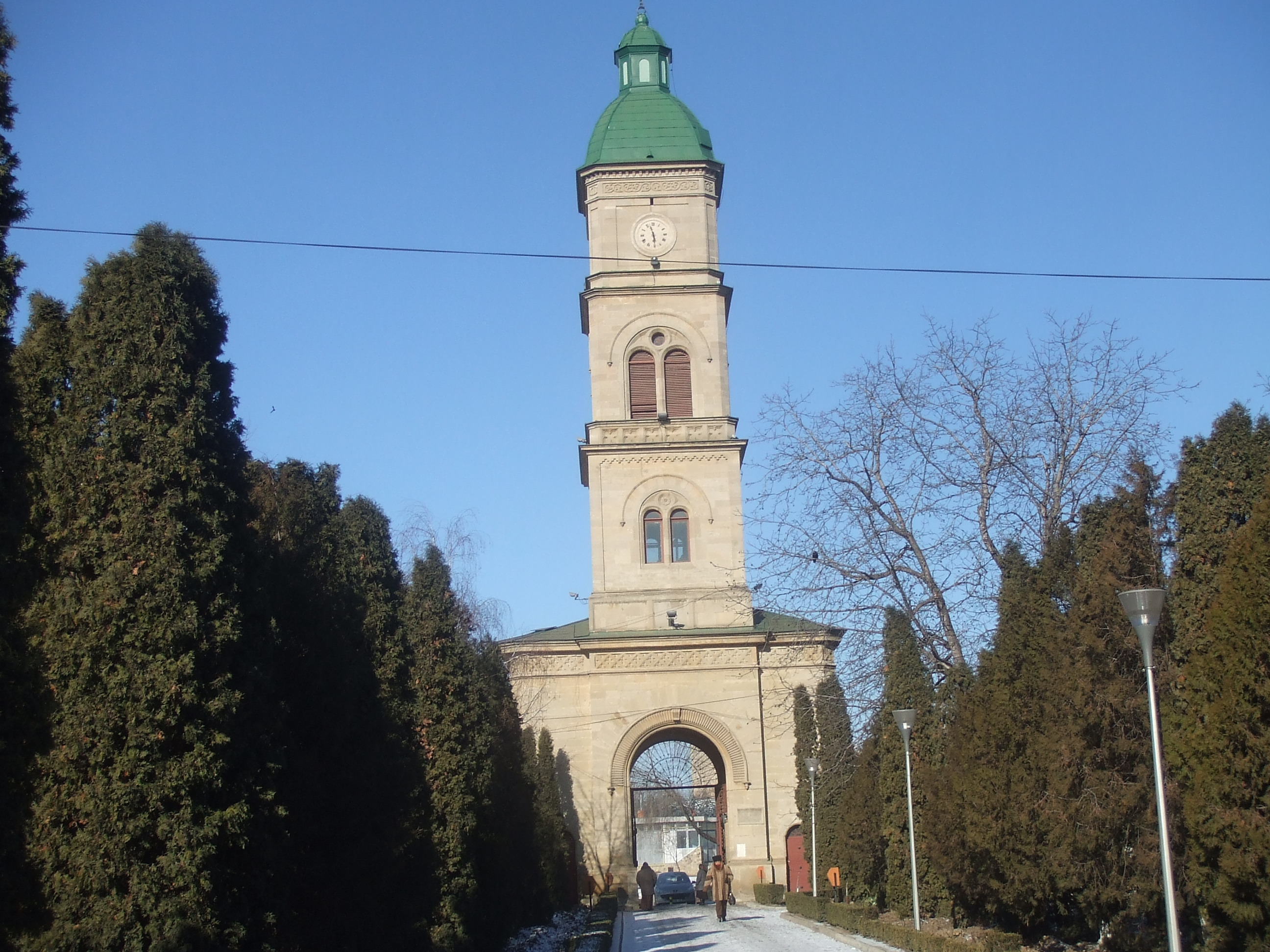
Bell tower

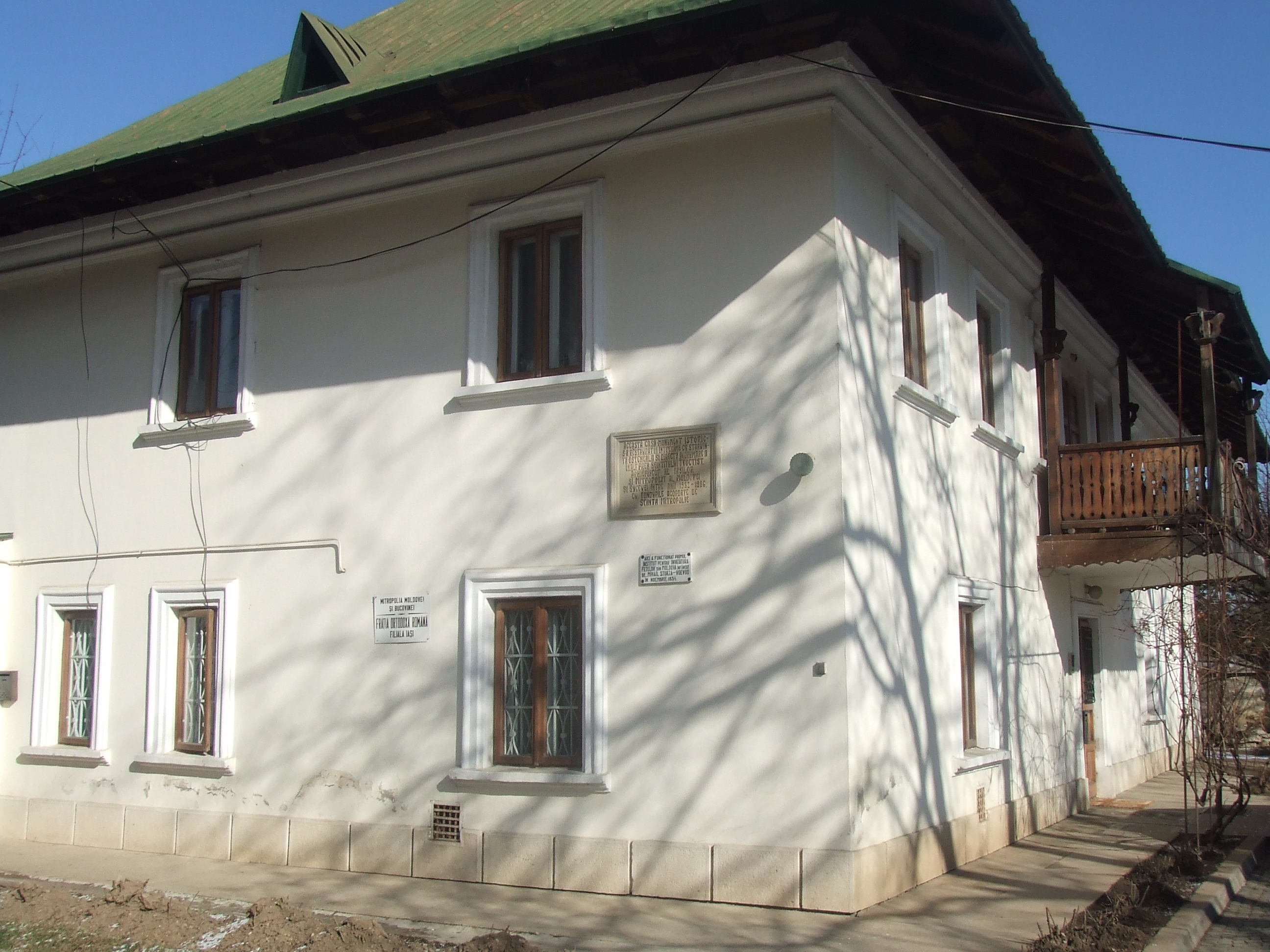
Parish house
