= Antonios Papadakis =

Antonios Papadakis (Greek: Αντώνιος Παπαδάκης; 1810–1878) was a Greek merchant from Lassithi Plateau on the island of Crete. He left his entire huge fortune to the University of Athens which proclaimed him its greatest benefactor. Every year “Antonios Papadakis Scholarships” enable outstanding university students to pursue their studies.

== Childhood ==
Antonios Papadakis was born in Psychro, Lassithi Plateau, Crete when Crete was under Ottoman rule. He was a son of Fragios Papadakis, priest of Psychro. As a child Antonios experienced many struggles and tragic events. These included Also the wars to stifle the Greek War of Independence on Crete in 1823, arrests, abductions and the slaughter of his custodian father.

In 1823, Antonios together with his two brothers, Emmanouil and Andreas were abducted by the Ottomans. The three orphaned boys were sold as slaves: Antonios, aged thirteen, to Constantinople; Emmanouil, fourteen, and the younger Andreas, to Alexandria, Egypt, where both converted to Islam. Later, in Alexandria, the two brothers pursued military careers where they reached very high-ranking positions. Emmanouil became a major general and then Minister of Military Affairs of Egypt, where he was known as Ismail Selim Pasha. The younger brother, Andreas, became the chief of Constabulary in Alexandria.

== Education and career ==
Antonios remained in Constantinople for six years as a slave. In 1829 he escaped to Odessa where, with the help of Alexandru Sturdza, he found employment in a Greek printing shop for some time. He also learned and improved his skills in the Greek language and was soon enrolled at the College of Agriculture and Agronomics in Odessa.

After graduating in 1833, Antonios worked in Sturdza family estates where he cultivated land and also learned how to organize, maintain and trade livestock. He acquired skills that made him an excellent merchant. Later he was appointed director of Roxandra Sturdza’s vast estates in Bessarabia. In this position he expanded his knowledge in cattle-raising, animal husbandry and trade. He became a visionary businessman of discernment and wisdom. Living a simple life, he acquired large tracts of land and real estate to become a very wealthy man.

== Return to Athens ==
In 1848, settled permanently in Athens, Antonios acquired Greek citizenship and continued his profitable import-export and trade activities, where his assets increased enormously. He was actively involved in many social issues and numerous committees: the Educational Society, the Board of the National Bank of Greece, Charities, supporting orphanages and schools by allocating large sums of money to education and other national purposes. He also supported the Cretan war for independence from the Ottomans and aided Cretans in their fight for a free homeland.

== Death, bequest and endowments ==
He died on December 27, 1878. His will bequeathed to the University of Athens all of his tangible and intangible assets: real estate properties, including his homes and buildings, bonds, bank shares and accounts along with very large sums of money, all of which was invested to produce revenues which are still used for scholarships given to outstanding students every year and for the entire period of their studies in the University of Athens.

Until the present day, more than three thousand “Antonios Papadakis Scholarships” have been administered from revenues that come from this bequest. The University of Athens, in honor of its greatest benefactor, erected a marble bust and a plaque in two of its historic buildings and the name of Antonios Papadakis has been engraved under that of its founder, King Otto. A marble mausoleum has also been erected in the First Cemetery of Athens.

== Sources ==
- Papyrus Larousse Britannica, 61 volumes
- Encyclopedia CHARI PATSI
- "The benefactors of the University of Athens" by Dimitrios A. Dimitriadis
