= 1786 in Russia =

Events from the year 1786 in Russia

== Incumbents ==
- Monarch – Catherine II

== Events ==
- Court Riding Arena in Saint Petersburg begins construction
- Creaking Pagoda completed in Tsarskoye Selo
- Don Host Oblast established
- Fevey - premier of opera by Vasily Pashkevich with libretto by Catherine the Great
- Pashkov House completed in Moscow
- St. Catherine's Cathedral completed in Kherson
- Vodootvodny Canal completed

== Births ==
- Dmitry Begichev, civil servant, writer, senator
- Alexander Chavchavadze, Georgian poet and nobleman, Russian general
- Auguste de Montferrand, French architect who worked principally in Russia
- Roksandra Skarlatovna Edling, courtier (d. 1844)
- Fyodor Glinka, poet and author
- Gavriil Ignatyev, general
- Maria Nesselrode, courtier (d. 1803)
- Grand Duchess Maria Pavlovna of Russia (1786–1859), daughter of Paul I of Russia
- Pavel Schilling, diplomat and inventor
- Ekaterina Semenova, actress
- Roxandra Sturdza, philanthropist and writer
- Sergey Uvarov, scholar and civil servant influential in education
- Filipp Vigel, nobleman, civil servant, memoirist
- Otto Magnus von Stackelberg, archaeologist and artist
- Karl Gustav von Strandmann, general

== Deaths ==
- Jovan Horvat, general and founder of New Serbia
- Thomas MacKenzie (Russian admiral), admiral and founder of Sevastopol
- Julia von Mengden, lady-in-waiting and confidant of Grand Dutchess Anna Leopoldovna
