= Christoph Wilhelm Hufeland =

German physician and naturopath (1762–1836)

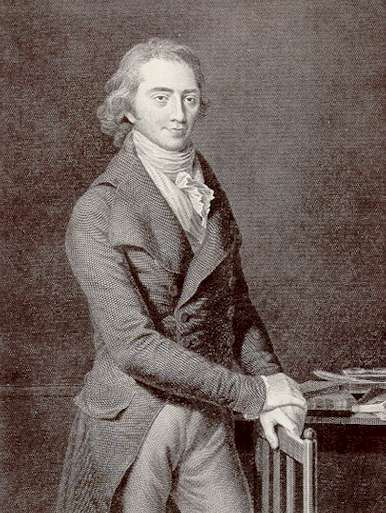
- Engraving by Johann Friedrich Müller, after a painting by J. F. A. Tischbein (1802)
- Born: 12 August 1762; Langensalza
- Died: 25 August 1836 (aged 74); Berlin
- Occupations: Physician, naturopath, writer

Christoph Wilhelm Friedrich Hufeland (12 August 1762 – 25 August 1836) was a German medical doctor, naturopath and writer. Considered one of the most eminent practical physicians of his time in Germany, he authored numerous works displaying extensive reading and a cultivated critical faculty.

== Biography ==
Hufeland was born at Langensalza, Saxony (now Thuringia) and educated at Weimar, where his father held the office of court physician to the grand duchess. In 1780 he entered the University of Jena, and in the following year went on to Göttingen, where in 1783 he graduated in medicine.

After assisting his father for some years at Weimar, he was called in 1793 to the chair of medicine at Jena, receiving at the same time the positions of court physician and professor of pathology at Weimar. During this time, he began a substantive correspondence with Immanuel Kant. In 1798 Frederick William III of Prussia granted him the position director of the medical college and generally of state medical affairs at the Charité, in Berlin. He filled the chair of pathology and therapeutics in the University of Berlin, founded in 1809, and in 1810 became councillor of state. In 1823, he was elected a member of the Royal Swedish Academy of Sciences.

In time he became as famous as Goethe, Herder, Schiller, and Wieland in his homeland.

Hufeland was a close friend of Samuel Hahnemann and published his original writings in his journal in 1796. He also "joined the Illuminati order at this time, having been introduced to freemasonry in Göttingen in 1783." He also seems to have professed an interest in Chinese Alchemy and methods of extending longevity.

The most widely known of his many writings is the treatise entitled Makrobiotik oder Die Kunst, das menschliche Leben zu verlängern (1796), which was translated into many languages, including in Serbian by Jovan Stejić in Vienna in 1828. Of his practical works, the System of Practical Medicine (System der praktischen Heilkunde, 1818–1828) is the most elaborate. From 1795 to 1835, he published a Journal der praktischen Arznei und Wundarzneikunde. His autobiography was published in 1863.

Hufeland died on 25 August 1836, in Berlin.

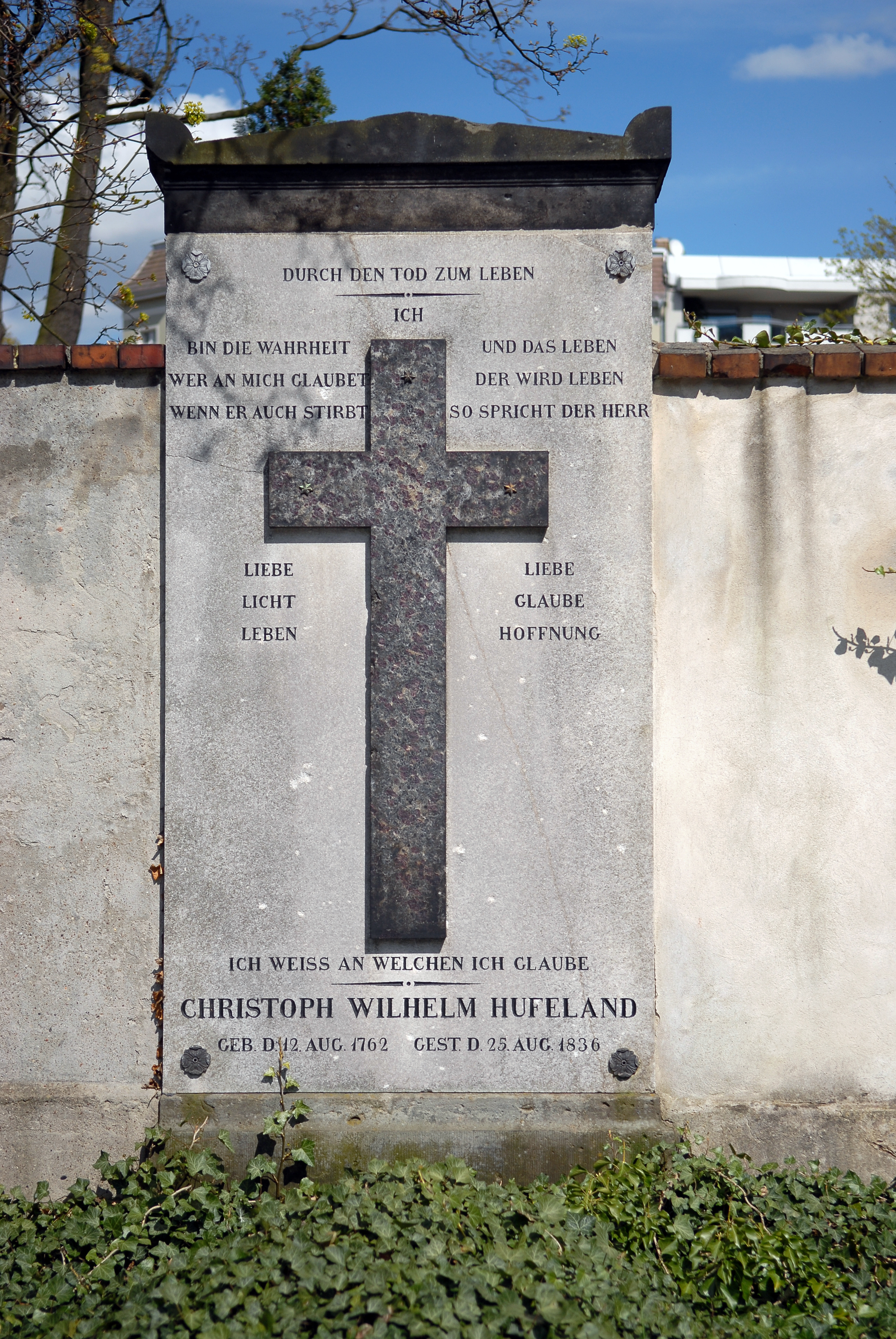
Grave of Christoph Wilhelm Hufeland in the Dorotheenstadt cemetery in Berlin

== Naturopathy ==
Hufeland was an early supporter of naturopathic medicine who posited the existence of a vitalistic "life force", which he believed could be maintained through behavioral and dietary practices. Hufeland was influenced by Hippocrates and promoted what he termed "natural therapeutics" (naturtherapeutik). He supported the use of homeopathy.

The term macrobiotics was used by Hufeland in his book Macrobiotics: The Art of Prolonging Life, that was translated into English in 1797. The book endorsed a program for good health and prolonging life. Hufeland recommended a vegetarian diet. Goethe and his wife took interest in the book. His German disciples gave his dieting and health ideas the name of the Hufelandist movement.

George Ohsawa, founder of the macrobiotic diet based on yin and yang foods, was influenced by Hufeland.

== Marriage and issue ==
He first married Juliane Amelung (1771–1845) and married for the second time to Elisabeth Helene Troschel (1777–1862). From his first marriage he had:

- Elwira Laura (born in 1799), married to Karl Wilhelm von Becherer
- Rosalia (born in 1801), married her cousin August Wilhelm Adolph Hufeland
- Elisabeth, married Prince Alexandru Sturdza, scion of the reigning Princes of Moldavia. Through their son Prince Nicolae Sturdza (died in 1832) Christoph Wilhelm Hufeland is great-great-grandfather of Queen Natalie of Serbia and great-great-great-grandfather of King Alexander I of Serbia.

== Bibliography ==
=== Works ===
- Enchiridion medicum oder Anleitung zur medizinischen Praxis: Vermächtniß einer Fünfzigjährigen Erfahrung. Sechste Auflage. Jonas Verlagsbuchhandlung. Berlin,
- Medizinischer Nutzen der elektrischen Kraft beim Scheintod, Verlag Rockstuhl, Bad Langensalza, 1. Reprintauflage 1783/2008, ISBN 978-3-938997-37-6
- Vollständige Darstellung der medicinischen Kräfte und des Gebrauchs der salzsauren Schwererde . Rottmann, Berlin 1794 Digital edition by the University and State Library Düsseldorf
- Die Kunst, das menschliche Leben zu verlängern . (Volume1/2) Haas, Wien 1798 Digital edition by the University and State Library Düsseldorf
- Armen-Pharmakopöe, entworfen für Berlin nebst der Nachricht von der daselbst errichteten Krankenanstalt für Arme in ihren Wohnungen . Realschulbuchhandlung, Berlin 3. Aufl. 1818 Digital edition by the University and State Library Düsseldorf
- Conspectus Materiae medicae secundum Ordines naturales in Usum Auditorium . Dümmler, Berolini Editio altera aucta 1820 Digital edition by the University and State Library Düsseldorf
- Armen-Pharmakopöe . Reimer, Berlin 4. Aufl. 1825 Digital edition by the University and State Library Düsseldorf
- Armen-Pharmakopöe : Zugleich eine Auswahl bewährter Arzneimittel und Arzneiformeln . Reimer, Berlin 7.Aufl. 1832 Digital edition by the University and State Library Düsseldorf
- Makrobiotik oder Die Kunst das menschliche Leben zu verlängern, Stuttgart: A.F. Macklot, 1826.
- Aphorismen und Denksprüche, Verlag Rockstuhl, Bad Langensalza, 1. Reprintauflage 1910/2009, ISBN 978-3-86777-066-8
- Bibliothek der practischen Heilkunde Veröffentlicht in der academischen Buchhandlung, 1802. Notizen: v. 6 Digitised on Google Books
- Hufeland's Art of Prolonging Life, edited by William James Erasmus Wilson, 1854.

=== Studies ===
- Helmut Busse: Christoph Wilhelm Hufeland, Blaeschke Verlag, St. Michael, Austria, 1982
- Klaus Pfeifer: Medizin der Goethezeit – Christoph Wilhelm Hufeland und die Heilkunst des 18. Jahrhunderts, Verlag Böhlau, Cologne, 2000, ISBN 978-3-412-13199-9
- Günther Hufeland: Christoph Wilhelm Hufeland (1762–1836), Verlag Rockstuhl, Bad Langensalza, 2002, ISBN 978-3-936030-79-2
- Wolfgang U. Eckart: Geschichte der Medizin, Heidelberg 2005
