= 1844 in Russia =

- Decades: 1820s; 1830s; 1840s; 1850s; 1860s
- See also: History of Russia; Timeline of Russian history; List of years in Russia

Events from the year 1844 in Russia.

== Incumbents ==
- Monarch – Nicholas I

== Births ==
- Marija Mesjtjerskaja, courtier (d. 1868)
- Varvara Rudneva, physician (d. 1899)
- April 1 – Nikolai Skrydlov, admiral (d. 1918)
- May 25 - Konstantin Savitsky, Russian painter.
- Ilya Repin - Russian painter.
- Vasily Polenov - Russian artist.
- Anatoly Koni - Russian jurist and politician.

== Deaths ==
- Roksandra Skarlatovna Edling, courtier (b. 1786)
- Carl Eberhard von Trinius born in (b. 1776)
- Ivan Andreyevich Krylov, Russian author.
- Yevgeny Abramovich Baratynsky, Poet.
