= Ismail Selim Pasha =

Egyptian-Greek Ottoman general

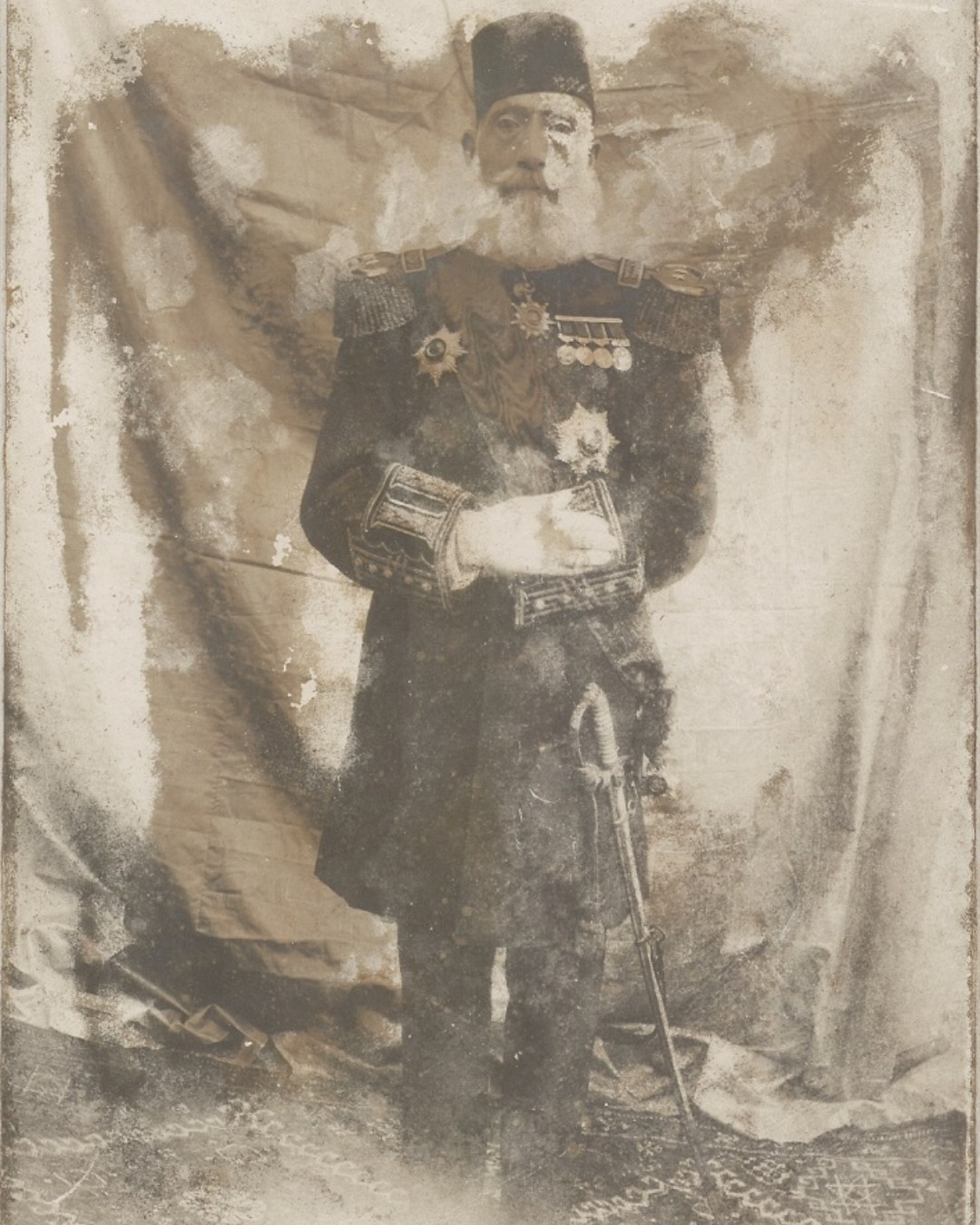
- Born: Emmanouil Papadakis c. 1809; Psychro, Crete, Ottoman Empire
- Died: 1867 (aged 58); Crete, Ottoman Empire
- Burial place: Cairo, Khedivate of Egypt
- Other name: Ismail Ferik Pasha
- Relatives: Antonios Papadakis (brother)
- Military career
- Allegiance: Khedivate of Egypt, Egyptian Army
- Rank: Ferik (lieutenant general)
- Conflicts: • Egyptian–Ottoman War (1831–1833) • Cretan Revolt

Ismail Selim Pasha (Arabic: إسماعيل سليم باشا, Greek: Ισμαήλ Σελίμ Πασάς, c. 1809–1867), also known as Ismail Ferik Pasha, was an Egyptian general of Greek origin. He also served as Minister of Military Affairs of Eyalet of Egypt, which was Ottoman Empire's administrative state. Selim Pasha was the brother of the Greek merchant and benefactor Antonios Papadakis.

== Early life ==
Ismail Selim was born Emmanouil (Greek: Εμμανουήλ Παπαδάκης) around 1809 in the Psychro village, located at the Lasithi Plateau on the island of Crete. He was a son of the priest of Psychro, Fragios Papadakis (Greek: Φραγκιός Παπαδάκης). When the priest was slaughtered in 1823 by the Ottomans during the Greek War of Independence, Emmanouil and his younger brothers Antonios Papadakis (Greek: Αντώνιος Παπαδάκης (1810-1878) and Andreas were captured by the Ottoman forces under Hassan Pasha who seized the plateau and were sold as slaves.

== Military career ==
Selim was sold to Egypt where he converted to Islam and was admitted to the Egyptian Military Academy. After graduating, he pursued a military career and fought with Ibrahim in the campaigns in Syria. Selim rose quickly to the rank of Ferik (major general) and was appointed the Minister of Military Affairs of the state of Egypt. Ismail Selim Pasha gifted a yacht called Feyz-i Cihat belonging to the Egyptian Khedivate to the Ottoman Sultan Abdulaziz in 1862.

== Return to Crete and death ==
In 1866, Selim replaced Shaheen Pasha, in the command of over 20,000 Egyptian troops sent by the Khedive of Egypt Isma'il Pasha, to assist the Ottomans in quelling the great revolt on his native land. By a coincidence of fate, Cretan revolutionaries were receiving supplies and financial support from Selim's brother Antonios who lived in Athens. Antonios had been sold to Constantinople and later managed to escape to Odessa where he prospered under the protection of the Sturdza family and became very wealthy. Selim was aware of his brother's life and had been corresponding with him.

In Crete, Selim took part in several battles as well as in the siege of the Arkadi Monastery. During the late spring of 1867, he and Omar Pasha marched towards the Lasithi plateau aiming to crush the rebels. Soon after the destruction of Lasithi, Selim died of an unknown cause. According to one reference he died of typhoid fever, while other sources attribute his death to the complications of a gunshot wound he had received earlier in Stylos, and a third reference tells that the death of Ismail might have been poisoning. It was said that Ismail did not move enough against the villagers, and therefore, Omar Pasha punished him. When his brother Antonios learned about the death of his brother, he is rumored to have said that "perhaps my brother was hit by one of the weapons I sent". His body was transferred to Egypt and buried in Cairo with high honors, whereas a cenotaph dedicated to him was erected in Heraklion and stood until 1925. His bust and Portrayed are at the Egyptian National Military Museum in Cairo.
