= Denis Harvey =

Canadian journalist and television executive (1929–2003)

- Born: Denis Martin Harvey; August 15, 1929; Hamilton, Ontario, Canada
- Died: December 7, 2003 (aged 74); Canada
- Occupations: Journalist, television executive, editor-in-chief

Denis Martin Harvey (August 15, 1929 – December 7, 2003) was a Canadian journalist and television executive who served as executive editor of The Hamilton Spectator and Montreal Gazette, editor-in-chief of the Toronto Star, and vice-president in charge of English-language television at the Canadian Broadcasting Corporation.

== Print journalism ==
Harvey was born on August 16, 1929, in Hamilton, Ontario. In 1947 he dropped out of high school and went to work as a copy boy for The Hamilton Spectator. He later worked as a sports reporter and labour columnist for the paper. In 1954 he found Donald Ritchie, who was wanted in connection with the attempted murder of United Auto Workers President Walter Reuther, in a Windsor, Ontario diner. Harvey got an exclusive interview with Ritchie before notifying police. In 1961 he became executive editor of the Spectator.

In 1966, Harvey became editor of The Canadian. Four years later he became executive editor of the Montreal Gazette. Harvey led the paper during the October Crisis. He believed paper had a duty to inform the public and defied the provincial and federal governments' request to hold back some information, even after Quebec's Minister of Justice, Jérôme Choquette, threatened to have him and his editors arrested.

== CBC ==
In 1973, Harvey joined CBC as assistant general manager and chief television news editor. In his position of assistant general manager, he assisted in the launch of CBC's English radio stereo network and oversaw the creation of radio programing, including Sunday Morning. In 1978 he left the network to become editorial director of the Toronto Star. He later became the paper's vice-president and editor-in-chief. He left the Star in 1981 due to "philosophical differences over news policies." In 1982, Harvey rejoined the CBC as head of its sports division.

In 1983, Harvey was appointed vice-president in charge of English-language television, succeeding Peter Herrndorf. In this position, Harvey oversaw the launch of CBC Newsworld and increased the amount of Canadian programing on the network from 80% to 91%. During his quest to increase the amount of Canadian programing on the network, Harvey was criticized by some, including the Toronto Star's Antonia Zerbisias, for commercializing the network by airing programs that appealed to mass audiences and imitated American styles. Harvey also guided the network through budget cuts which resulted in downsizing and the elimination of local programming at eleven stations. He retired in August 1991 and assumed the newly created position of special adviser to the network president.

== Later life and death ==
Harvey suffered from chronic illness during his later years at the CBC. He underwent a heart bypass operation in 1989 and had knee surgery two years later. In the summer of 2003, Harvey was diagnosed with pancreatic cancer. He died of heart failure on December 7, 2003.

== Personal life ==
Harvey married Romanian princess and fellow journalist Marina Sturdza in 1970; the couple later divorced. Harvey's later wife, Louise Lore, was a television producer for CBC who produced Man Alive. He had two children from a previous marriage. His daughter Lynn Harvey is also a television producer.
