= Ottoman yacht Sultaniye =

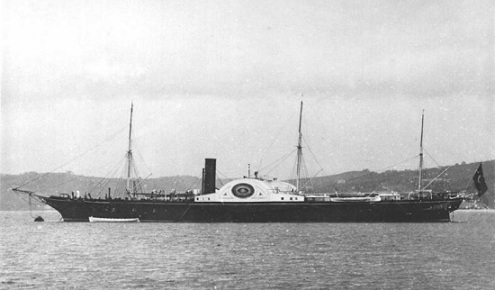
- Sultaniye in Constantinople, between 1880-1893

History

Ottoman Empire
- Name: Feyz-i Cihat (1852–1862); Sultaniye (1862–1912)
- Ordered: 1851
- Builder: C.J. Mare and Company, Blackwall, Middlesex
- Laid down: 1852
- Launched: 23 December 1852
- Completed: 1853
- Out of service: 1905
- Fate: Scuttled, 20 April 1912

General characteristics
- Displacement: 2,909 tons burthen
- Length: 119.2 m (391 ft 1 in) lpp
- Beam: 12.2 m (40 ft)
- Draft: 9 m (29 ft 6 in)
- Installed power: 2 × boilers; 750 indicated horsepower (560 kW)
- Propulsion: 1 × marine steam engine; 2 × paddlewheels
- Speed: 15 knots (28 km/h; 17 mph)
- Complement: 140
- Armament: 4 × 14-pounder guns

Sultaniye was a royal yacht of the Ottoman Empire. She was originally built for the Egyptian fleet in the early 1850s and was initially named Feyz-i Cihat before being given to the Ottoman sultan as a gift in 1862. She was renamed at that time and served as the sultan's yacht for the next fifty years before being placed in reserve in 1905. She was eventually scuttled off İzmir on 20 April 1912 during the Italo-Turkish War.

== Design ==
Feyz-i Cihat was a wooden-hulled paddle steamer. She was 119.2 m (391 ft 1 in) long between perpendiculars, with a beam of 12.2 m (40 ft) and a draft of 9 m (29 ft 6 in). Her tonnage was 2,909 tons burthen. She was propelled by a pair of paddlewheels that were driven by a 2-cylinder marine steam engine, with steam provided by two coal-fired boilers. Her propulsion system was rated at 750 indicated horsepower (560 kW) for a top speed of 15 knots (28 km/h; 17 mph). Her coal storage capacity amounted to 300 metric tons (300 long tons; 330 short tons). She had a crew of 140.

The ship was originally armed with four 14-pounder guns, but by 1890, these had been replaced with a pair of 120 mm (4.7 in) Krupp guns and two 37 mm (1.5 in) 1-pounder guns. In 1896, her armament was reduced to a pair of Hotchkiss revolver cannon.

== Service history ==
The navy of the Eyalet of Egypt ordered the vessel in 1851. The keel for Feyz-i Cihat was laid down in 1852 at the C.J. Mare and Company in Blackwall, London in the United Kingdom. She was launched on 23 December 1852, and was completed for sea trials in early January the following year. The ship was quickly delivered to Egypt later that month; during the voyage, she passed the leg from Malta to Alexandria, Egypt in sixty-eight hours. At the time, the previous record was eighty hours.

Egypt sent the vessel back to Britain in 1861 to be modernized, and she was rebuilt over the course of the following year at Forrester & Co. in Liverpool. On 31 October 1862, she ran into the British schooner Grace Evans in the River Mersey, severely damaging the schooner. After the work was completed, Ismail Selim Pasha, the Egyptian Minister of Military Affairs, presented the ship to the Ottoman sultan Abdulaziz as a gift. She was then commissioned into the Ottoman Navy and was renamed Sultaniye. The ship carried Mehmed Fuad Pasha on a trip to meet with the Russian Tsar (Emperor) Alexander II in the Crimea in 1867. Sultaniye carried Fuad Pasha to the Livadia Palace, arriving there on 20 August for a meeting that lasted for two days. That year, Abdulaziz embarked on a tour of Western Europe that concluded with a stop in the Austro-Hungarian Empire; there, after meeting with Kaiser Franz Josef I, he boarded Sultaniye in Vienna and then steamed down the Danube to the Black Sea, and then home to the capital at Constantinople. An Austro-Hungarian flotilla of ships, with Franz Josef I aboard one of them, escorted Sultaniye through the river as far as the border with the Ottoman Empire. In 1873, Sultaniye carried Naser al-Din Shah Qajar and his entourage, first on a four-day voyage from Brindisi to Constantinople and some days later, on a three-day voyage from Constantinople to Poti, on their course from Europe to Qajar Persia.

During the Russo-Turkish War of 1877–1878, Sultaniye was used as a transport vessel supporting operations at Batumi in the eastern Black Sea. On the night of 12 May 1877, Russian torpedo boats launched from the support ship Velikit Knjaz Konstantin passed through the naval mine barrier outside the harbor and hit Sultaniye with a torpedo, though the weapon failed to detonate and the ship was not damaged. After the Ottoman crew raised the alarm, the Russian vessels fled the harbor. Sultaniye continued to support the Ottoman forces in Batumi until just before the armistice ended the fighting on 31 January 1878; the terms of the agreement required the Ottomans to surrender Batumi. Earlier in January, as Russian forces approached the Ottoman capital through the Balkans, several vessels began transporting a reserve army from Dedeagac to Gelibolu; Sultaniye and the ironclad warship Osmaniye joined the operation and carried the last elements of the army on 31 January.

Sultan Murad V, who had come to power in 1876 after Abdulaziz was deposed, distrusted the navy and left it chronically underfunded. The ships of the fleet saw little activity and their crews were poorly trained. Sultaniye was laid up in 1905 in İzmir and saw no further active service. In October 1911, after the start of the Italo-Turkish War, the garrison at İzmir prepared to scuttle the ship to block the harbor entrance. After they loaded the ship with stone, they sank her at the harbor entrance outside İzmir on 20 April 1912, along with the transport vessel İzmir. The defenses were later strengthened with a barrage of mines. Ironically, the Italian participation in the Triple Alliance with the German and Austro-Hungarian empires prevented them from directly attacking the Ottoman provinces in Anatolia, and Austro-Hungarian pressure had already forced the Italians to abandon a blockade of Ionia.
