= Marina Sturdza =

Romanian journalist

Princess Marina Nicole Sturdza
- Born: 25 April 1944; Brasov, Transylvania
- Died: October 24, 2017 (aged 73); New York City
- Father: Prince Ion Sturdza
- Mother: Princess Ioana Soutzo

Princess Marina Nicole Sturdza (25 April 1944 – 24 October 2017) was a Romanian princess and humanitarian activist. She is an aristocrat and member of the House of Sturdza.

== Early life ==
Marina Nicole Sturdza was born a princess in Romania on 25 April 1944, in Brasov, Transylvania. Both of her parents came from Romanian aristocracy; her birth father was Prince Ion Sturdza (of the aristocratic Sturdza family, who had been the ruling family of Moldavia) and her mother Princess Ioana Soutzo. They divorced when Marina was very young.

One year after King Michael's abdication in 1947, Sturdza's parents fled Romania under pseudonyms. Marina's grandmother (with whom she stayed for a while) put her on a train to Switzerland. She was sedated so as not to speak Romanian and thus betray her national origin when meeting a diplomat by the Swiss border, where she was reunited with her parents in Zürich. The family later moved to Canada; her mother and stepfather worked in a piggery in Saskatchewan, where Marina resided in a single-room schoolhouse. The family moved to Toronto eight months later.

== Journalism, activism and awards ==
Sturdza became a fashion and culture as columnist for two American newspapers, The Globe and Mail and The Toronto Star and briefly worked for Oscar de la Renta. Later on, she became a marketing manager for UNICEF greeting cards in Geneva, Switzerland. In the 1990s, Sturdza returned to Romania alongside interior designer Ioana Ertegun (wife of the president of Atlantic Records, Ahmet Ertegun). Sturdza supported a number of child welfare and palliative care programs for children in her home country.

She was president of strategic planning agencies Marina Sturdza Enterprises and Summits International, which specialised in Eastern Europe. She was patron of a number of charities and humanitarian causes concerning the region, including Hope and Homes for Children. She was also on the board of Pro Patrimonio, the Romanian national trust. In 2005, she received the Women of Achievement Humanitarian Award from the European Union.

== Personal life ==
In 1970, Sturdza married journalist Denis Harvey; the couple later divorced. Sturdza was multilingual and spoke at least 6 different languages.

Sturdza died in New York City on 22 October 2017 from cancer-related causes.

She had one stepdaughter and two step-grandchildren.
