= Alexandru Sturdza =

Russian publicist and diplomat (1791–1854)

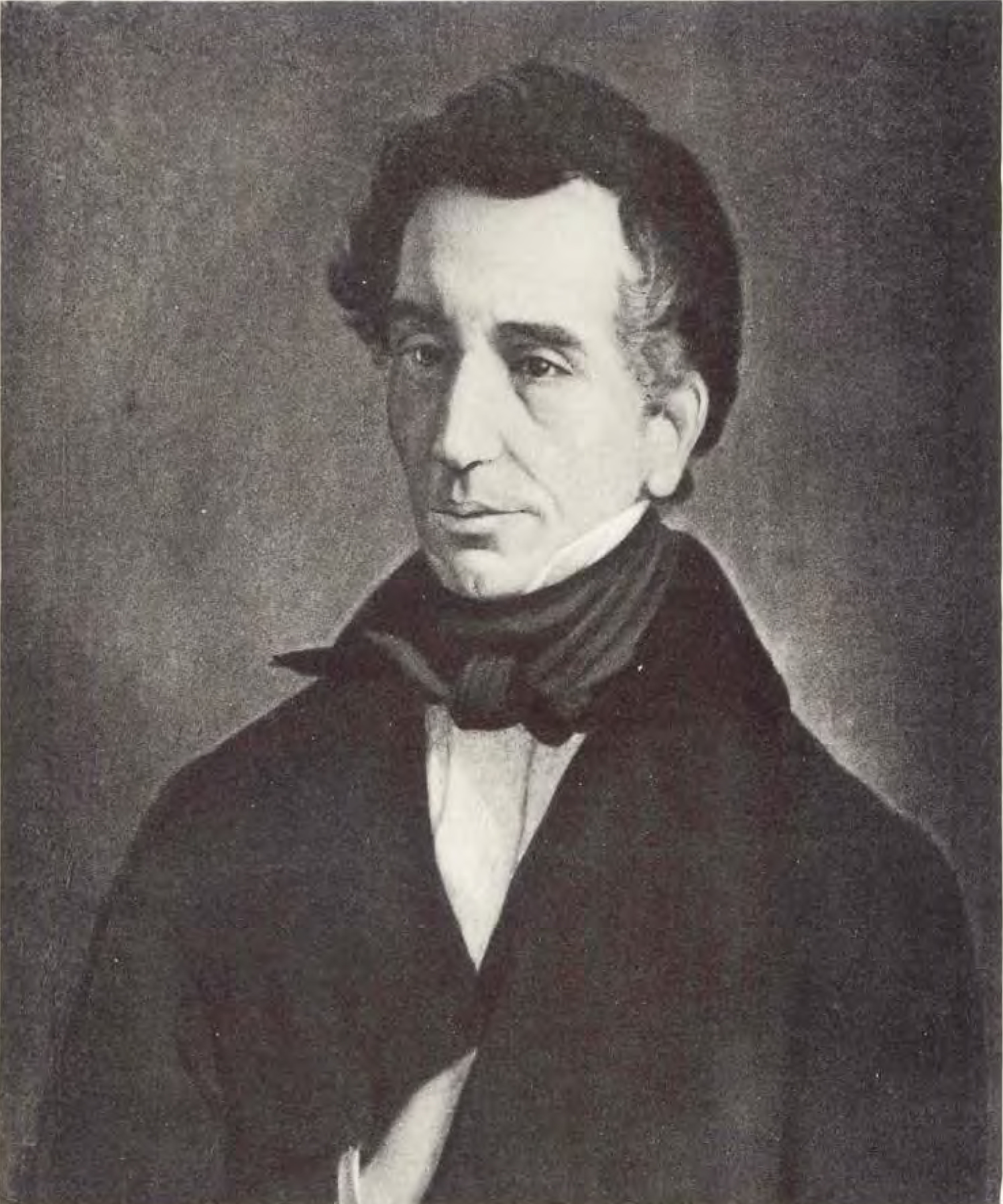
Portrait

Prince Alexandru Sturdza (Russian: Александр Скарлатович Стурдза, romanized: Aleksandr Skarlatovich Sturdza; Jassy, Moldavia, 18 November 1791 – Odessa, 13 June 1854) was a Russian publicist and diplomat of Romanian origin. In his writings, he referred to himself with a French rendition of his name, Alexandre Stourdza.

== Early life ==
Alexandru Sturdza was a member of the House of Sturdza. He was born in Jassy, in Moldavia, and was the son of Scarlat Sturdza, the governor of Bessarabia, and Princess Ekaterina Mourousis, the daughter of Constantine Mourouzis, Prince of Moldavia. Through his mother he was related to all Greek Phanariote families. Alexandru Sturdza was brother of Roxandra Edling-Sturdza and a cousin of Mihail Sturdza, Prince of Moldavia from 1834 to 1849. After his family fled Bessarabia in 1802 in order to avoid the repression from the Ottomans, he was educated in Germany, then Russia.

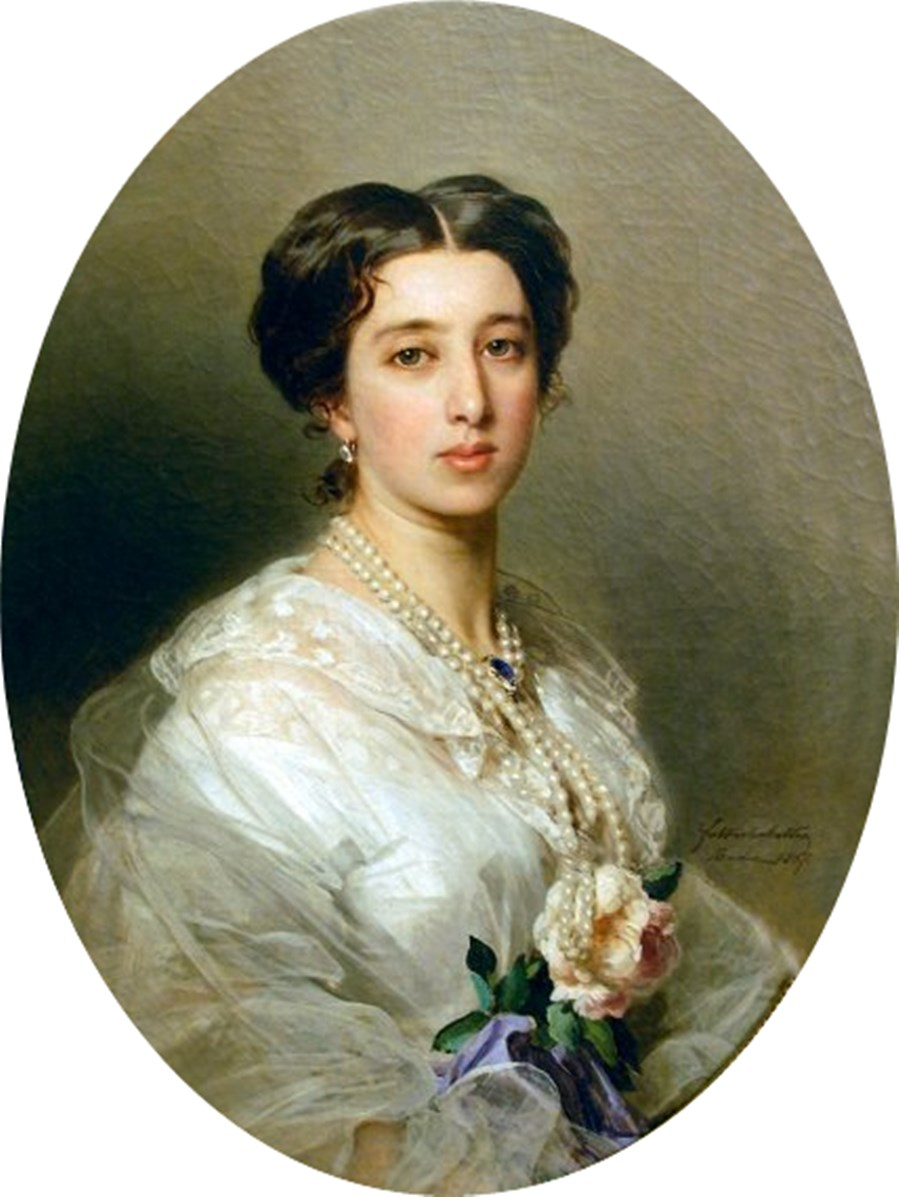
Winterhalter's portrait of Princess Maria Gagarin, the eldest daughter of Alexander Sturdza. Her descendants were known as Princes Gagarin-Sturdza.

== Later life ==
He entered the Russian diplomatic service in 1809 and acted as secretary of Ioannis Kapodistrias during the Congress of Vienna. Under this capacity, he drafted the first version of the treaty of the Holy Alliance, from the penciled notes of the Czar Alexander I. Because of his Greek origins and his friendship with Ioannis Kapodistrias, he was a strong supporter of Philhellenism before and during the Greek War of Independence. Together with his sister Roxandra he sponsored philanthropic activities to help Greek war refugees. He retired in Odessa in 1830, where he devoted himself to his literary works.

== Personal life ==
In 1819, he settled at Dresden and married Elisabeth Hufeland, daughter of German physician Christoph Wilhelm Hufeland. They had one son and two daughters:

- Prince Ionita Sandu Sturdza (b. 1820);
- Princess Maria Sturdza (1821–1890), married Prince Eugen Gagarin and was progenitor of House of Gagarin-Sturdza;
- Princess Olga Sturdza (d. 1895), married Prince Mikhail Aleksandrovich Obolensky (1821–1886).

== Works ==
Striving to develop a renovated form of Orthodox Christianity and to promote it in Western Europe, he wrote Considérations sur la doctrine et l'esprit de l'Église orthodoxe (Stuttgart, 1816).

His Mémoire sur l'état actuel de l'Allemagne, written at the request of Tsar Alexander I during the Congress of Aix-la-Chapelle, was an attack on the German universities, repeated in Coup d'oeil sur les universites de l'Allemagne (Aachen, 1818). It aroused great indignation in Germany, which indignation has been attributed to the levity with which its author arraigned the German national character and branded the universities as hotbeds of the revolutionary spirit and atheism. His other important works are La Grèce in 1821 (Leipzig, 1822) and Oeuvres posthumes religieuses, historiques, philosophiques et litteraires (5 vols., Paris, 1858–1861).

== Sources ==
- "Стурдза" . Brockhaus and Efron Encyclopedic Dictionary (in Russian). 1906.
