= Alecu Russo =

Moldavian writer, literary critic and publicist (1819–1859)

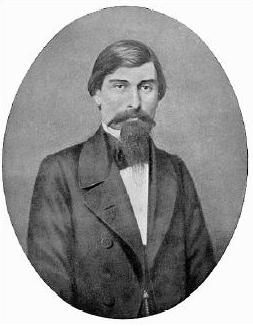
Alecu Russo

Alecu Russo (17 March 1819 – 5 February 1859) was a Romanian writer, literary critic and publicist.

Russo is credited with having discovered one of the most elaborate forms of the Romanian national folk ballad Miorița. He was also a contributor to the Iași periodical Zimbrul, in which he published one of his best-known works, Studie Moldovană ("Moldovan Studies"), in 1851–1852.

He also wrote Iașii și locuitorii lui în 1840 ("Iași and its inhabitants in 1840"), a glimpse into Moldavian society during the Organic Statute administration, and two travel accounts (better described as folklore studies), Piatra Teiului and Stânca Corbului.

Russo is also notable for his Amintiri ("Recollections"), a memoir, and for the prose poem Cântarea României. Both these works appeared in 1855 in Vasile Alecsandri's literary magazine, România Literară.

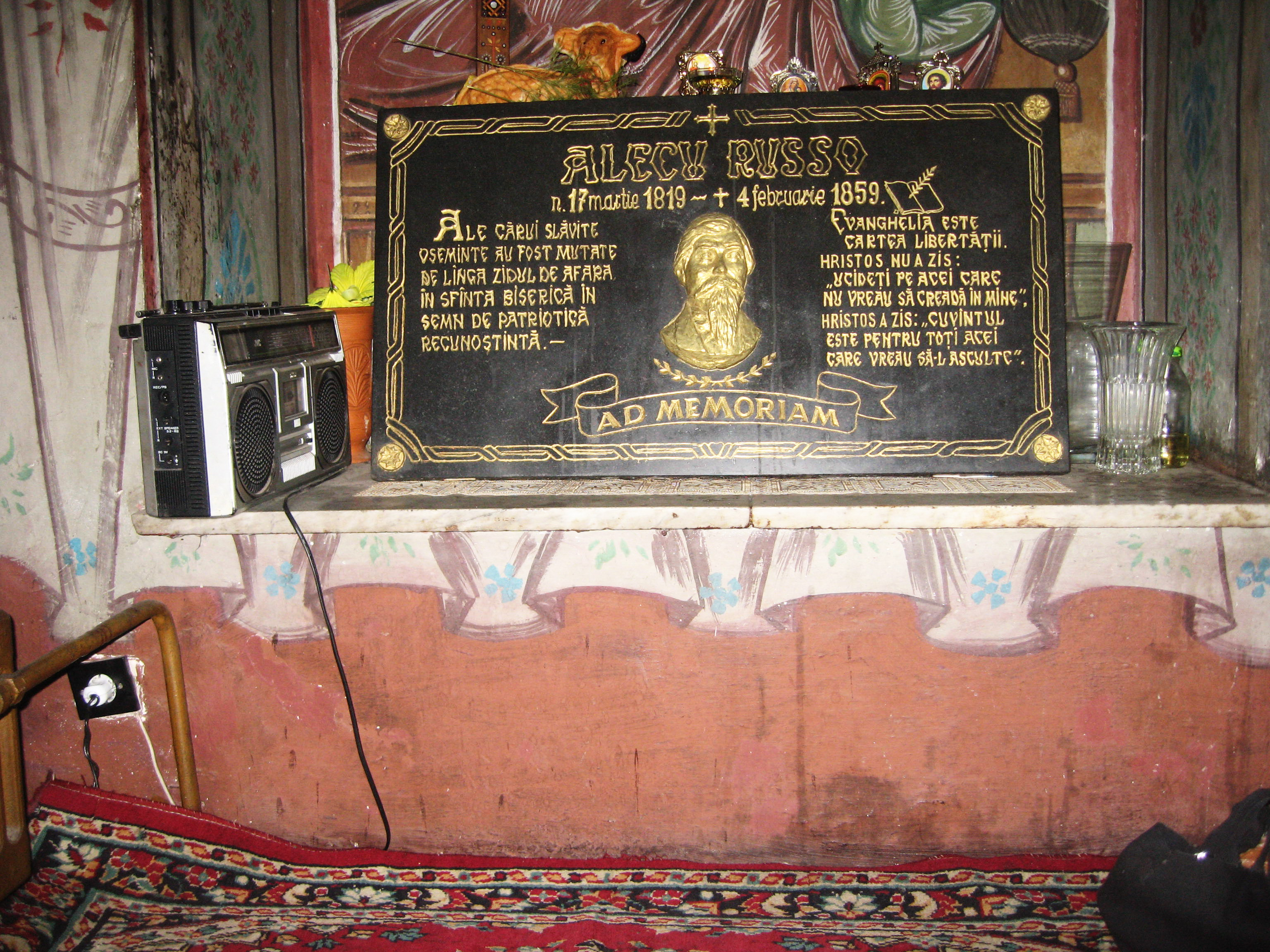
Russo's grave at Bărboi Church

He died shortly before the age of 40. His cause of death is recorded as troahnă, usually denoting influenza, but sometimes a euphemism for tuberculosis. He was buried with great pomp at the Bărboi Church, in Iași.

== Presence in anthologies ==
The Bessarabia of my Soul / Basarabia Sufletului meu. A collection of poetry from the Republic of Moldova, bilingual English & Romanian, Daniel Ioniță and Maria Tonu (editors), with Eva Foster, Daniel Reynaud and Rochelle Bews, MediaTon, Toronto, Canada, 2018. ISBN 978-1-7751837-9-2
