= Dimitrie C. Sturdza-Scheianu =

Romanian historian and member of the House of Sturdza

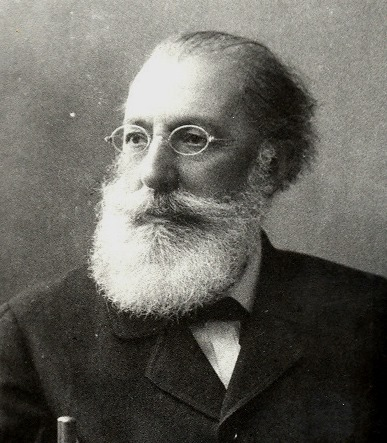
Dimitrie C. Sturdza-Scheianu

Prince Dimitrie C. Sturdza-Scheianu (May 19, 1839–February 6, 1920) was a Romanian historian and member of the House of Sturdza.

Born in Iași into the aristocratic Sturdza family, his parents hired private foreign tutors for his education. Sturdza thus learned French, German, Latin, Ancient Greek and Old Church Slavonic, then the liturgical language of Romanian Orthodoxy. It is presumed that he later studied agriculture and law, but it is not known where. A member of the Conservative Party, he sat in the Chamber of Deputies. There, he frequently spoke about the plight of the peasants obliged to perform the corvée, arguing for their emancipation.

A book collector, Sturdza spent many years buying up old texts in Romanian Cyrillic. His large, valuable collection saved numerous works for posterity. He donated his entire library to the Romanian Academy, which elected him an honorary member in 1907. Sturdza also studied archival documents. Together with Dimitrie Sturdza and Ghenadie Petrescu, he edited an eleven-volume set of old Romanian texts, published between 1888 and 1909. Moreover, in 1891 he helped publish documents collected abroad by the late Eudoxiu Hurmuzachi. Sturdza's erudition allowed him to classify the collection, some six thousand in all, written in multiple languages.

In late 1891, Sturdza became Justice Minister in the government of Lascăr Catargiu, intending to correct societal injustices, particularly in rural areas. Refusing to bow to pressure to alter his program, he resigned weeks later. He then became head of the Agricultural Bank, serving until 1895 and attempting to alleviate the economic situation of the peasantry. Not finding support for his reformist tendencies within the Conservative Party, he left it in 1897. He died in Bucharest in 1920.
