= Alexandru Constantin Moruzi =

Moldavian and later Romanian politician

Prince Alexandru Constantin Moruzi (1805–1873), a Moldavian, later Romanian politician and member of the Mourousis family, was the Prime Minister of United Principalities between 23 December 1861 and 15 February 1862.
