= Roxandra Sturdza =

Russian philanthropist and writer (1786–1844)

Princess Roxandra Sturdza
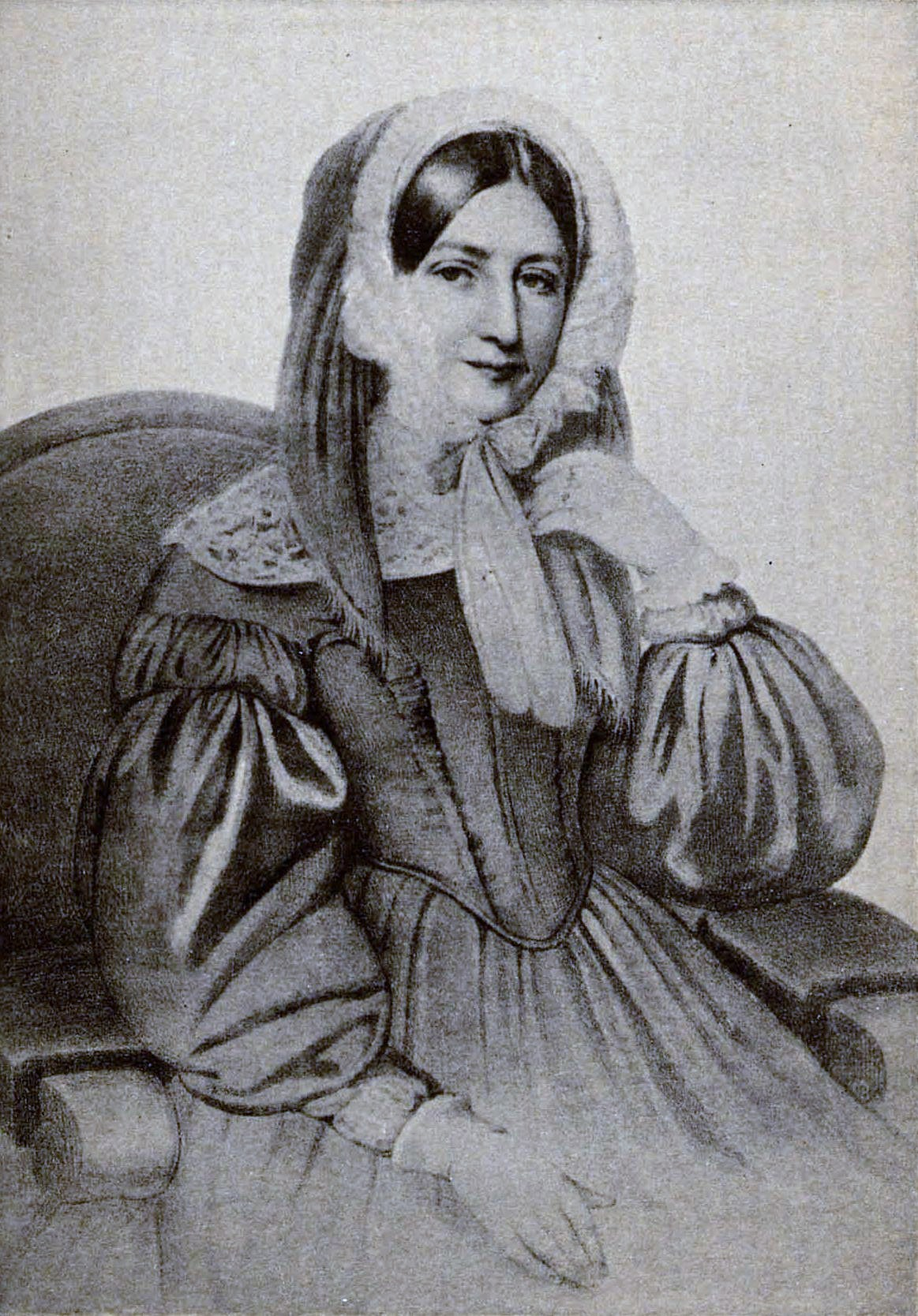
- Portrait of 1830
- Born: 12 October 1786; Constantinople, Ottoman Empire
- Died: 16 January 1844 (aged 57); Odessa, Russian Empire
- Other names: Roksandra; Roxana; Roxane
- Title: Princess
- Spouse: Count Albert-Gaëtan Edling (m. 1816; died 1841)
- Parents: Prince Skarlat Sturdza (father); Princess Sultana Mourousis (mother)
- Family: Sturdza

Princess Roxandra Skarlatovna Sturdza (also spelled Roksandra, Roxana, or Roxane; 12 October 1786 – 16 January 1844) was a Russian Imperial courtier, philanthropist, writer, and humanitarian advocate of Moldavian–Greek noble descent. Born in Constantinople into the prominent Sturdza family, she was the daughter of Prince Skarlat Sturdza and Princess Sultana Mourousis and the granddaughter of Constantine Mourouzis, former Prince of Moldavia.

As a young woman she joined the Russian Imperial court and became a lady-in-waiting to Elisabeth Alexeievna. Throughout the turbulent Napoleonic era and the Greek War of Independence, Sturdza became widely known for her extensive philanthropic initiatives, especially for refugees fleeing conflicts in the Balkans and the Ottoman Empire.

After settling in Odessa with her husband, Count Albert-Gaëtan Edling, she organized schools, orphanages, and relief programs for displaced Greeks, Moldavians, and Bulgarians, becoming one of the leading female humanitarians of early-19th-century Russia. Her correspondence with European diplomats, writers, and intellectuals—over 200 letters survive—demonstrates her influence in political, cultural, and charitable networks across the continent. She spent her final decades in Odessa, where she continued philanthropic work until her death in 1844.

== Biography ==
=== Early life ===
Princess Roxandra was born on 12 October 1786 in Constantinople. Her parents were Prince Skarlat Sturdza and Princess Sultana Mourouzis (1762–1839). Roxandra was a sister of Alexandru Sturdza and cousin of the Prince of Moldavia Mihail Sturdza. In 1790, the Sturdza family moved to Iași, Moldavia, and then in 1800 settled in Saint Petersburg, where Roxandra continued her education in Russian and Greek. In 1806 she became the master of ceremonies at the court of Alexander I of Russia and Empress Elizabeth Alexeievna. In 1809, Roxandra met Ioannis Kapodistrias, then the Foreign Minister of the Russian Empire, an encounter that inspired her lifelong interest in social purpose and philhellenism.

=== Family Roots ===
Roxandra’s maternal grandfather was the Prince of Moldavia, Constantine Mourousis. The Mourouzis family was from the Greek Phanar neighborhood of Constantinople, where members of this prominent family served as political and cultural leaders among the Christian subjects of the Ottoman Empire. Her father, Skarlat Sturdza, a graduate of the Princely Academy of Iași, descended from the Moldavian Sturdza family of Greek ancestry, known for humanitarian involvement since at least the 16th century. After the family emigrated to Saint Petersburg, Skarlat became a counselor to Empress Elizabeth Alexeievna.

=== Marriage ===
In 1816, Roxandra married Count Albert Cajetan von Edling, Minister and Marshal of the Grand Duke of Saxony-Weimar. Because of her marriage, Roxandra is also known as Countess Roxandra or Roksandra Skarlatovna Edling-Sturdza. For many years she maintained residences in Weimar, Berlin, Vienna, Saint Petersburg, Wallachia, Bessarabia, and Odessa, from where she pursued philanthropic work and wrote her memoirs. Von Edling died in 1841.

=== Achievements ===
Roxandra’s philanthropic influence continued long after her death. She founded schools and supported humanitarian, educational, and relief causes during the Greek War of Independence (1821–1832). Inspired by Ioannis Kapodistrias, she became one of the most active female supporters of philhellenism and humanitarian relief in the early modern Greek world.

=== Philanthropy and Altruism ===
Roxandra sponsored numerous charitable activities and established an organization dedicated to improving the health and welfare of disadvantaged children. She provided clothing and food from her family estates in Bessarabia to aid the refugees who reached Odessa during the protracted Greek struggle for freedom against the Ottoman Empire. Her efforts to promote culture, education, and livelihood among displaced populations earned her admiration in contemporary Europe.

She died on 16 January 1844 in Odessa.

== See also ==
- Princely Academy of Bucharest & Princely Academy of Iași
- Alexandru Ioan Cuza University
- Alexander Mourousis
- Phanariotes, Ioan Sturdza, Dimitrie Sturdza
- Phanar Greek Orthodox College
- Ypsilantis

== Sources ==
- New International Encyclopedia, New York, Dodd & Mead
- Encyclopedia DRANDAKI-Μεγάλη Ελληνική Εγκυκλοπαίδεια ΔΡΑΝΔΑΚΗ, Π.-volume 22, page 412 Βικελαία Δημοτική Βιβλιοθήκη
- Encyclopedia HARH PATSH-ΧΑΡΗ ΠΑΤΣΗ Εθνική Βιβλιοθήκη της Ελλάδος
- Encyclopedia YDRIA-ΥΔΡΙΑ • Encyclopedia DOMH • Encyclopedia PAPYRUS-LAROUSSE-BRITANNICA-Νεώτερο Εγκυκλοπαιδικό Λεξικό ΗΛΙΟΥ Εθνική Βιβλιοθήκη της Ελλάδος
- A. Brezianu and V. Spanu, 2007, USA, Moruzi Constantin, History of Moldova ISBN 978-0-8108-5607-3
- Maria Tsatsou, Ideogramma, Athens, Memoirs of Roxandra Sturdza
