= Ioan Sturdza =

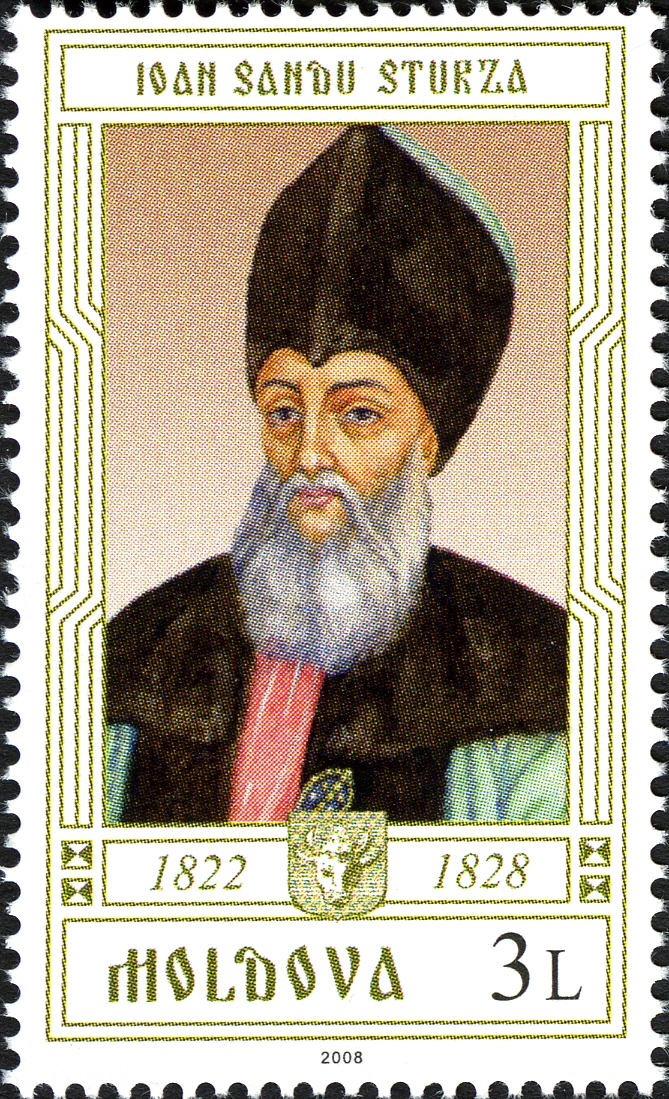
- 2008 stamp of Moldova

Prince of Moldavia
- Reign: 21 June 1822 – 5 May 1828
- Predecessor: Michael Soutzos
- Successor: Prince Mihail Sturdza
- Born: 1762; Iași
- Died: 2 February 1842 (aged 79-80); Bessarabia
- House: Sturdza family
- Religion: Orthodox

Prince Ioan Sandu Sturdza or Ioniță Sandu Sturdza (1762 – 2 February 1842) was the ruler (hospodar) of Moldavia from 21 June 1822 to 5 May 1828.

== Biography ==
Sturdza is considered the first indigenous ruler with the end of Phanariote rule (as a move the Ottoman Empire undertook after seeing the political disadvantages of Greek domination after the troubles in the Greek War of Independence).

Immediately after the Greek revolution, Prince Ioan Sturdza took an active part in subduing the roving bands of Eterists in Moldavia; he transformed the Greek language elementary schools into Romanian language ones and laid the foundation for that scientific national development which Prince Mihai Sturdza continued after 1834, especially after his founding of an upper school in the Trei Ierarhi Cathedral complex in Iași. Although his project for the confiscation of some Church properties was initially blocked by Russia, Sturdza opted not to revise his position.

Opposed by the boyars who had taken refuge in Imperial Russia during Ypsilanti's military rule, and threatened with the loss of his throne after the 1826 Russo-Turkish Akkerman Convention that established a seven-year term in office for Princes elected by the Sfatul boieresc (confirmed by the Ottomans, with Russia's approval), Sturdza agreed to many boyar demands, including tax cuts and exemptions from conscription. However, he ensured meritocratic criteria in access to public offices. At the same time, a conflict became apparent between high- and low-ranking boyars, after the proposed constitution of Ionică Tăutu was rejected by most of the former (a vocal minority under the leadership of Mihail Sturdza). In 1828, the Russians entered the country during the Russo-Turkish War of 1828-29 and took Prince Ioan prisoner. He died while being kept in Bessarabia and was later buried in Iași.

== Marriage and issue ==
He married Princess Ecaterina Rosetti-Roznoveanu (1764–1847). They had:

- Prince Nicolae, married Princess Maria Ghika-Comanesti (1805–1887), they had three daughters:
  - Princess Ecaterina Sturdza (b. 1826), married as his second wife Prince Constantin Moruzi (1819–1886), Chamberlain at the Imperial Court of Russia.
  - Princess Zoe Sturdza, married Prince Ioan Cantacuzino-Paşcanu (1827–1891), who served as general director of the Theater
  - Princess Pulcheria (1831–1874), married Colonel Peter Keșco (1830–1865) and became mother of Queen Natalie of Serbia and grandmother of King Alexander I of Serbia.

== See also ==
- Sturdza family

== Sources ==
- Mitican, Ion (2008). "Regina Serbiei, în vizită la bunica de la Iaşi". Ziarul Lumina.

Preceded by Turkish occupation	Prince of Moldavia; 1822–1828	Succeeded by Russian occupation
