= Mihail Sturdza =

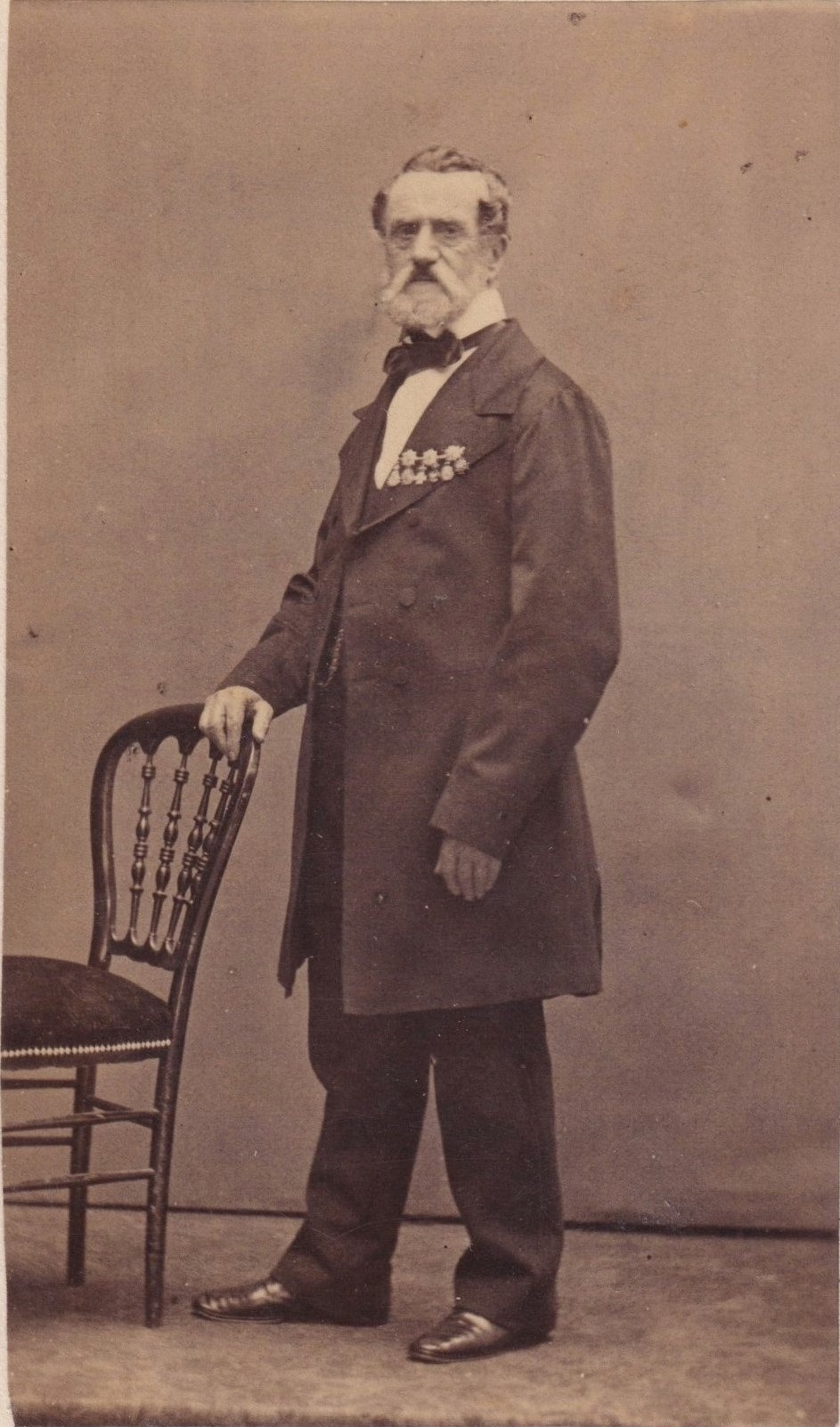
- Sturdza in the 1860s

Prince of Moldavia
- Reign: April 1834 – June 1849
- Predecessor: Ioan Sturdza
- Successor: Grigore Alexandru Ghica
- Born: 5 May [O.S. 24 April] 1794; Iași, Moldavia
- Died: 8 May 1884 (aged 90); Paris, France
- Spouses: Elisabeth Rosetti (m. 1817; div. 1822); Smaragda Vogoride
- Issue: Dimitrie; Grigore; Mihail; Maria
- House: Sturdza
- Father: Grigore Sturdza
- Mother: Mariora Callimachi
- Religion: Orthodox

Prince Mihail Sturdza (sometimes anglicized as Michael Stourdza; 5 May [O.S. 24 April] 1794 – 8 May 1884) was prince ruler of Moldavia from 1834 to 1849. He was cousin of Princess Roxandra Sturdza and Prince Alexandru Sturdza.

== Early life ==
He was born as third child and the only son of Grigore Sturdza, Lord of Cozmești, Grand Logothete (1758–1833) and his wife, Princess Maria Callimachi (1762–1822), daughter of Gregory Callimachi, reigning Prince of Moldavia.

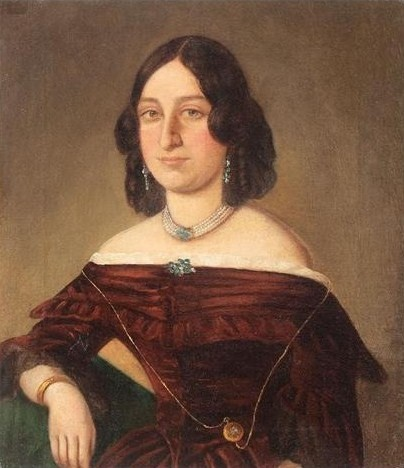
Princess Smaranda Sturdza, born Princess Vogoride of Samos

== Biography ==
A man of liberal education, he established in Iași, the Academia Mihăileană, the first University in Romania, a institution of higher education, and the precursor of the University of Iași. He brought scholars from foreign countries to act as teachers, and gave a very powerful stimulus to the educational development of the country.

In 1844 he decreed the emancipation of the Gypsies, which until then had been treated as slaves and owned by the Church or by private landowners; they had been bought and sold in the open market. Mihail also attempted the secularization of monastic establishments, which was carried out by Prince Alexandru Ioan Cuza in 1864, and the utilization of their endowments for national purposes.

Mihail quelled the attempted Moldavian Revolution of 1848 without bloodshed by arresting all the few conspirators and expelling them from the country.

Mihail's first wife was Elena Rosetti. His second wife was Princess Smaragda Vogoride, daughter of Stefan Vogoride, Prince of Samos.

He vacationed with his family annually at Baden in Germany. When his and Vogoride's 16-year-old son was killed in Paris in 1863, he erected a Greek Orthodox church in Michaelsberg (Baden-Baden) to serve as his crypt.

== Gallery ==
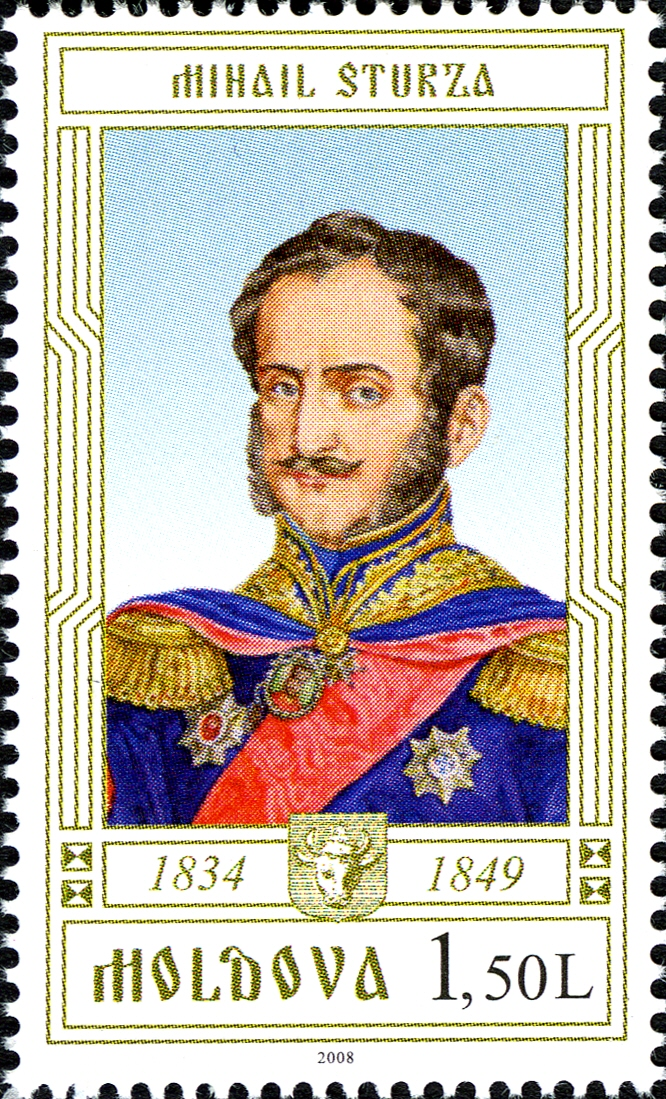
Commemorative stamp

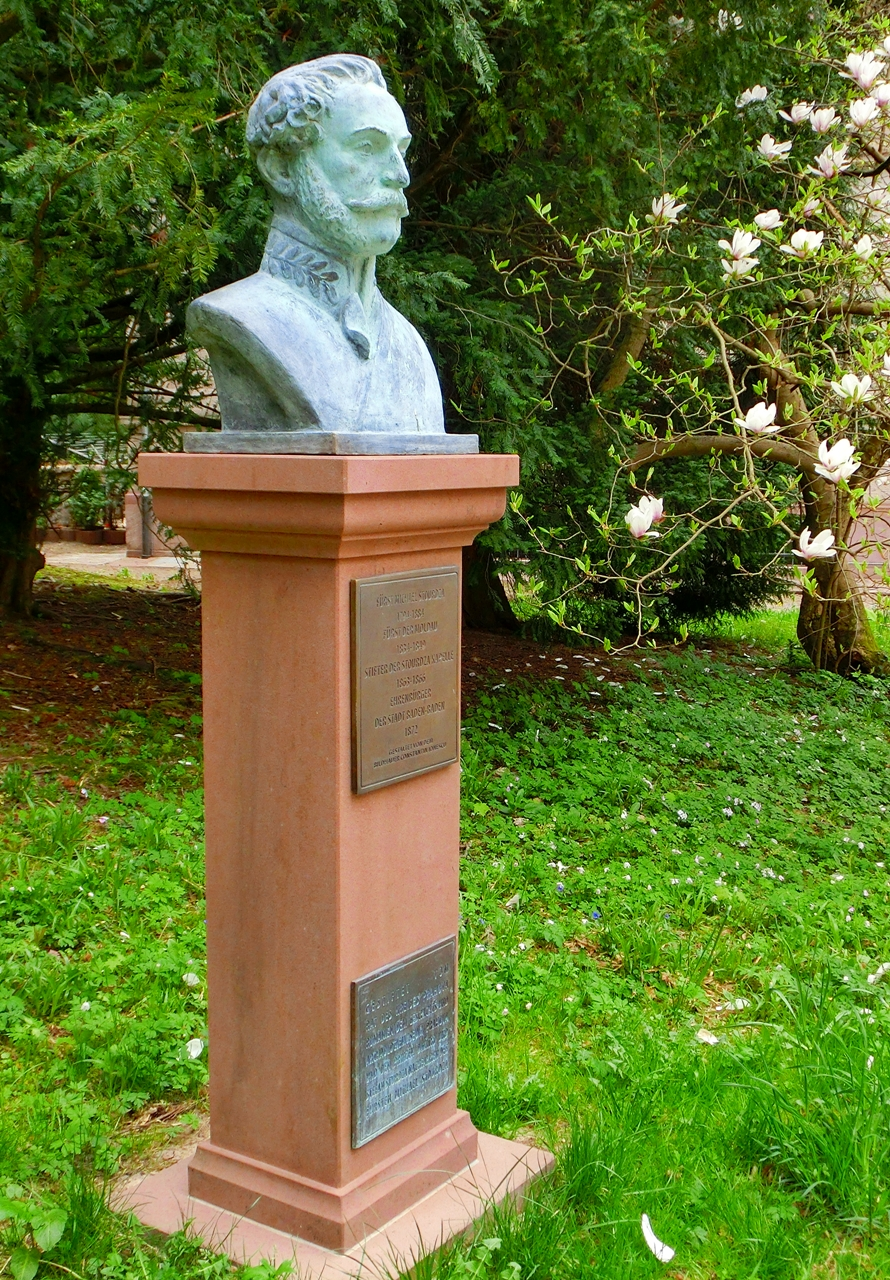
Bust of Mihail Sturdza in Baden-Baden

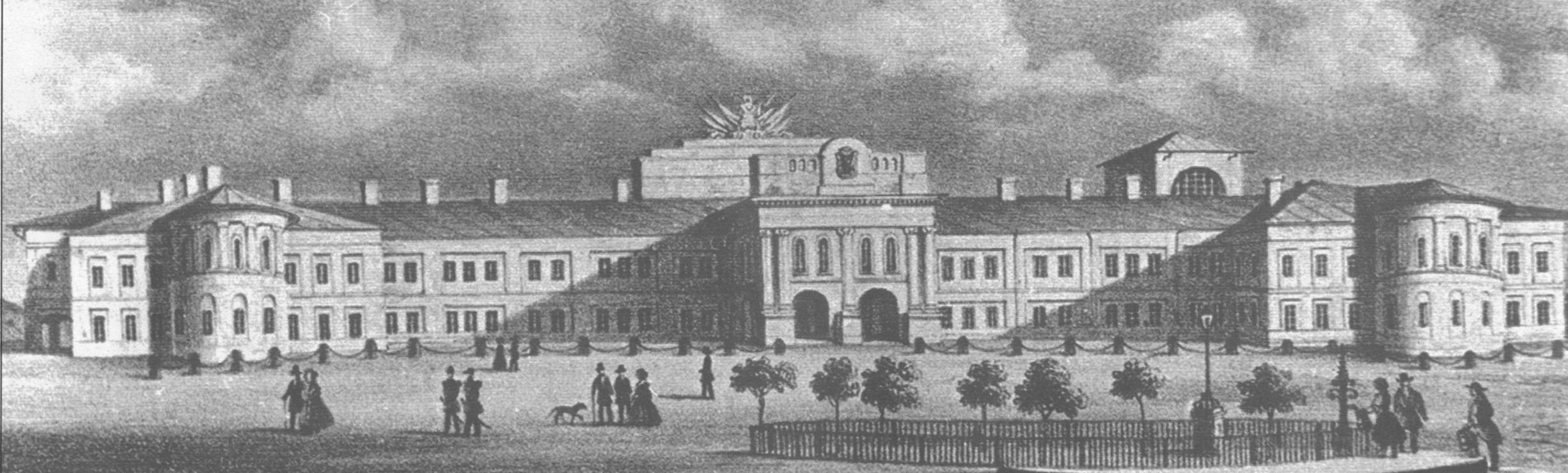
The Princely Court of Moldavia during the first half of the 19th century

== See also ==
- Sturdza family

== Notes ==
Preceded by Russian occupation	Prince of Moldavia; 1834–1849	Succeeded by Grigore Alexandru Ghica
