= Mourouzis family =

Prominent family

Coat of arms of Princes Muruzi

The House of Mourouzis (Greek: Μουρούζης) or Moruzi (Russian: Мурузи, Muruzi) is the name of an old and distinguished noble family which was first mentioned in the Empire of Trebizond, whose members later occupied many important positions within Ottoman Empire, Wallachia, Moldavia, Russian Empire and Romania.

== History ==
Its origins have been lost, but the two prevalent theories are that they were either a local family originating in a village which has a related name or else one that arrived with the Venetians during the Fourth Crusade (since there are records of a Venetian family with a similar name a generation earlier). They became one of the leading families of Phanariotes. The family moved to present-day Romania (the Danubian Principalities) in the 17th century, became Dragomans of the Porte and boyars, and gave Wallachia and Moldavia two hospodars – Princes Constantine and Alexander. Constantine's great grandson Demetrius fled to Russia after the outbreak of the Greek War of Independence, where his progeny was permitted to use their Princely title in 1893 and later in 1905. Members of the family remained in Romania and Bessarabia until the Soviet occupation post-World War II.

== Notable members ==
- Constantine Mourouzis (1730 – 1 May 1787), Dragoman of the Fleet, Grand Dragoman and Prince of Wallachia and Moldavia
- Alexander Mourouzis (1750/1760 – 1816), Grand Dragoman of the Ottoman Empire and Prince of Wallachia and Moldavia
- Panagiotis Mourouzis, Dragoman of the Fleet and Dragoman of the Porte
- Michael Mourouzis, (d. 1821) Dragoman of the Fleet
- Alexandru Constantin Moruzi (1815–1878), Romanian economist and politician
- Dumitru C. Moruzi (1850–1914), Moldavian-born Imperial Russian and Romanian civil servant, folklorist and writer
- Maria Moruzi-Cuza (d. 1921), wife of Ion I. C. Brătianu, and mother of Gheorghe I. Brătianu
- Yves Mourousi (1942–1998), French television and radio presenter and journalist

== Former properties of the Princes Muruzi ==
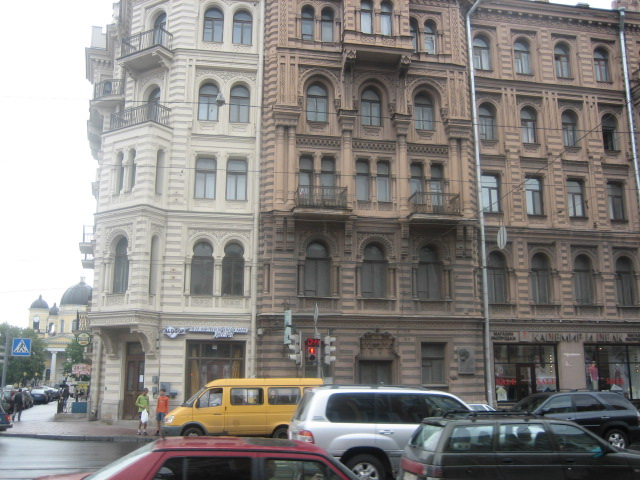
Muruzi palace in Saint Petersburg, Russia

== See also ==
- Muruzi House
