= Sturdza family =

Romanian Noble Family

Sturdza family coat of arms

The House of Sturdza, Sturza or Stourdza (Greek: Στούρτζα) is the name of an old Moldavian noble family whose origins can be traced back to the 1540s. Members of the family played important political role in the history of the Principality of Moldavia, Russia and later Romania.

== Origin ==
The Sturdza were a family of Phanariote Greek origin and devoted much energy to the restoration of Greek independence.

== Political family ==
The Sturdza family, a Moldavian princely family, has been long and intimately associated with the government first of Moldavia and afterwards of Romania. Its members belong to two main branches, which trace their descent from either Ioan Sturdza or Alexandru Sturdza, the sons of Chiriac Sturdza, who lived in the 17th century, and may be regarded as the founder of the family. Members active in government:

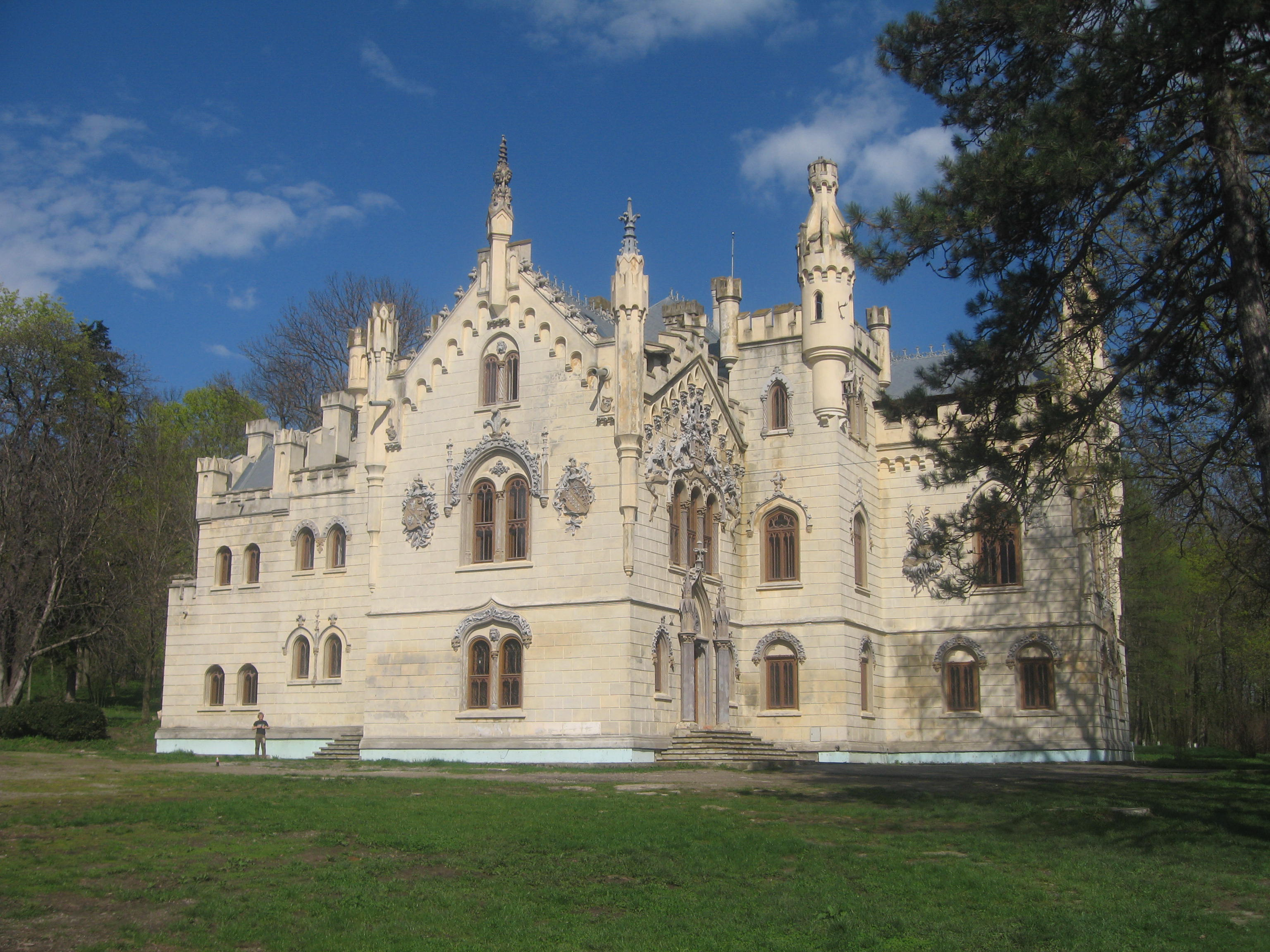
The Sturdza Castle in Miclăușeni

- Ioan Sturdza (1762 – 1842), prince of Moldavia from 1822 to 1828
- Mihail Sturdza (1795 – 1884), Prince of Moldavia from 1834 to 1849, modernizer of Moldavia
- Alexandru Sturdza, also known as Alexandre Stourdza (1791–1854), Russian publicist and diplomatist
- Grigore Sturdza (1821 – 1901), son of Mihail, army general and politician
- Dimitrie Sturdza (1833 – 1914), Romanian statesman
- Dimitrie C. Sturdza-Scheianu (1839 – 1920), Romanian historian
- Alexandru D. Sturdza (1869 – 1939), Romanian Army, colonel, German spy
- Mihail R. Sturdza (1886 – 1980), Romanian minister of Foreign Affairs
- Mihai Dimitrie Sturdza (1934 – 2020), Romanian historian
- Șerban-Dimitrie Sturdza (born 1967), Romanian politician

== Others ==
- Roxandra Sturdza (1786 – 1844), philanthropist and writer
- Lucia Sturdza-Bulandra (1873 – 1961), actress and theater director
- Marina Sturdza (1944 – 2017), former Romanian Princess and humanitarian activist
- Constantin Sturdza (born 1989), tennis player
- Dimitri Sturdza (born 1938), tennis player
