= Costache Aristia =

Romanian writer, actor, soldier and translator (1800–1880)

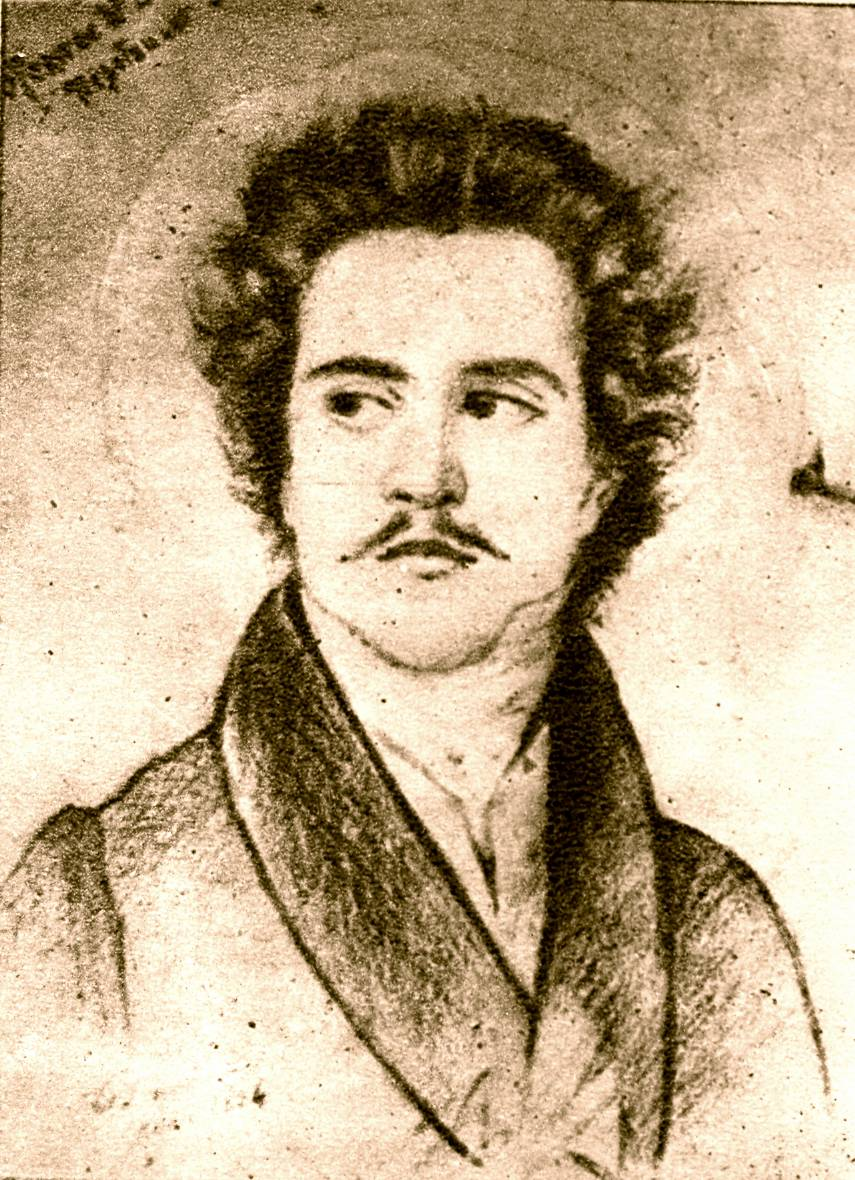
- Louis Dupré's portrait of Costache Aristia, ca. 1824
- Born: Constantin Chiriacos Aristia (Konstantinos Kyriakos Aristias); 1800; Bucharest, Wallachia or Istanbul, Ottoman Empire
- Died: 18 April 1880 (aged 79 or 80); Bucharest, Principality of Romania
- Occupations: actor, schoolteacher, translator, journalist, soldier, politician, landowner
- Writing career
- Period: c. 1820–1876
- Genres: epic poetry, lyric poetry, tragedy, short story
- Literary movement: Neoclassicism, Romanticism

Costache or Kostake Aristia (Romanian pronunciation: [kosˈtake arisˈti.a]; born Constantin Chiriacos Aristia; Greek: Κωνσταντίνος Κυριάκος Αριστίας, Konstantinos Kyriakos Aristias; transitional Cyrillic: Коⲛстантiⲛꙋ Aрiстia, Constantinŭ Aristia; 1800 – 18 April 1880) was a Wallachian-born poet, actor and translator, also noted for his activities as a soldier, schoolteacher, and philanthropist. A member of the Greek colony, his adolescence and early youth coincided with the peak of Hellenization in both Danubian Principalities. He first appeared on stage at Cișmeaua Roșie in Bucharest, and became a protege of Lady Rallou. She is claimed to have sponsored his voyage to France, where Aristia became an imitator of François-Joseph Talma.

Upon his return, Aristia took up the cause of Greek nationalism, joining the Filiki Eteria and flying the "flag of liberty" for the Sacred Band. He fought on the Wallachian front during the Greek War of Independence, and was probably present at the defeat at Drăgășani. He escaped the country and moved between various European states, earning protection from the Earl of Guilford, before returning to Bucharest as a private tutor for the Ghica family. Aristia used this opportunity to teach drama and direct plays, and thus became one of the earliest contributors to Romanian theater. A trendsetter in art and fashion, he preserved his reputation even as Wallachians came to reject Greek domination. He adapted himself to their cultural Francization, publishing textbooks for learning French, and teaching both French and Demotic Greek at Saint Sava College.

Under the Regulamentul Organic regime, Aristia blended Eterist tropes and Romanian nationalism. He became a follower of Ion Heliade Rădulescu, and helped set up the Philharmonic Society, which produced a new generation of Wallachian actors—including Costache Caragiale and Ioan Curie. He contributed to the effort of modernizing the language, though his own proposals in this field were widely criticized and ultimately rejected. Aristia was made popular by his translation of Vittorio Alfieri's Saul, which doubled as a nationalist manifesto, and earned accolades for his rendition of the Iliad; however, he was derided for eulogizing Prince Gheorghe Bibescu. He also contributed to cultural life in the Kingdom of Greece, where, in 1840, he published his only work of drama.

Aristia participated in the Wallachian Revolution of 1848, when, as leader of the National Guard, he arrested rival conservatives and publicly burned copies of Regulamentul Organic. During the backlash, he was himself a prisoner of the Ottoman Empire, and was finally expelled from Wallachia. He returned in 1851, having reconciled with the conservative regime of Barbu Dimitrie Știrbei, and remained a citizen of the United Principalities. He kept out of politics for the remainder of his life, concentrating on his work at Saint Sava, and then at the University of Bucharest, and on producing another version of the Iliad. Among his last published works are Bible translations, taken up under contract with the British and Foreign Bible Society.

== Biography ==
=== Youth ===
Aristia is generally believed to have been born in Bucharest, the Wallachian capital, in 1800. The date was pushed back to 1797 in some sources, but Aristia's relatives denied that this was accurate. In 1952, folklorist Dimitrios Economides, who conducted interviews with the Aristia family, argued that Costache was born in Istanbul, capital of the Ottoman Empire, "around the year 1800". At the time of his birth, Wallachia and Moldavia (the two Danubian Principalities) were autonomous entities of the Ottoman realm; Greek cultural dominance and Hellenization, represented primarily by Phanariotes, were at their "great acme". Though seen by scholar Petre Gheorghe Bârlea as Aromanian by origin, Aristia himself noted that, on his paternal side at least, he was a "good Greek". He described his relationship with Wallachia in terms of voluntary assimilation, as advised by his father: Fii grec și român zdravăn, fii recunoscător ("Be steadfast as a Greek and a Romanian, be thankful"). Immersed in Greek culture, he still had virtually no understanding of written Romanian until 1828.

Costache entered Bucharest's Greek School during the reign of Prince John Caradja, a Phanariote. His teachers there included philologist Constantin Vardalah. According to one late report by researcher Octav Minar, Aristia also debuted as a teacher of drama upon his return to Bucharest, at some point before 1815. His first-generation students supposedly included Stephanos "Natis" Caragiale, grandfather of the Romanian dramatist Ion Luca Caragiale. Before graduating, Aristia himself was an actor for the open-air venue at Cișmeaua Roșie. Scholar Walter Puchner, who dates these events to "the spring and autumn of 1817", questions the accuracy of historical records, noting that they contradict each other on the details; according to memoirist and researcher Dimitrie Papazoglu, Cișmeaua was in fact managed by "director Aristias". At that stage, acting in Wallachia was an all-male enterprise, and Aristia appeared as a female lead, in drag. The Cișmeaua troupe was sponsored by Caradja's daughter, Lady Rallou. According to various accounts, she was impressed by Aristia's talent, and reportedly sent him abroad, to the Kingdom of France, for Aristia to study under François-Joseph Talma. The details of this claim are disputed. Researcher Ioan Massoff notes that Aristia was never a member of Talma's acting class, but only a regular spectator to his shows, and after that his imitator. Puchner questions whether this trip ever took place, since "no evidence has surfaced for [Aristia's] stay in Paris."

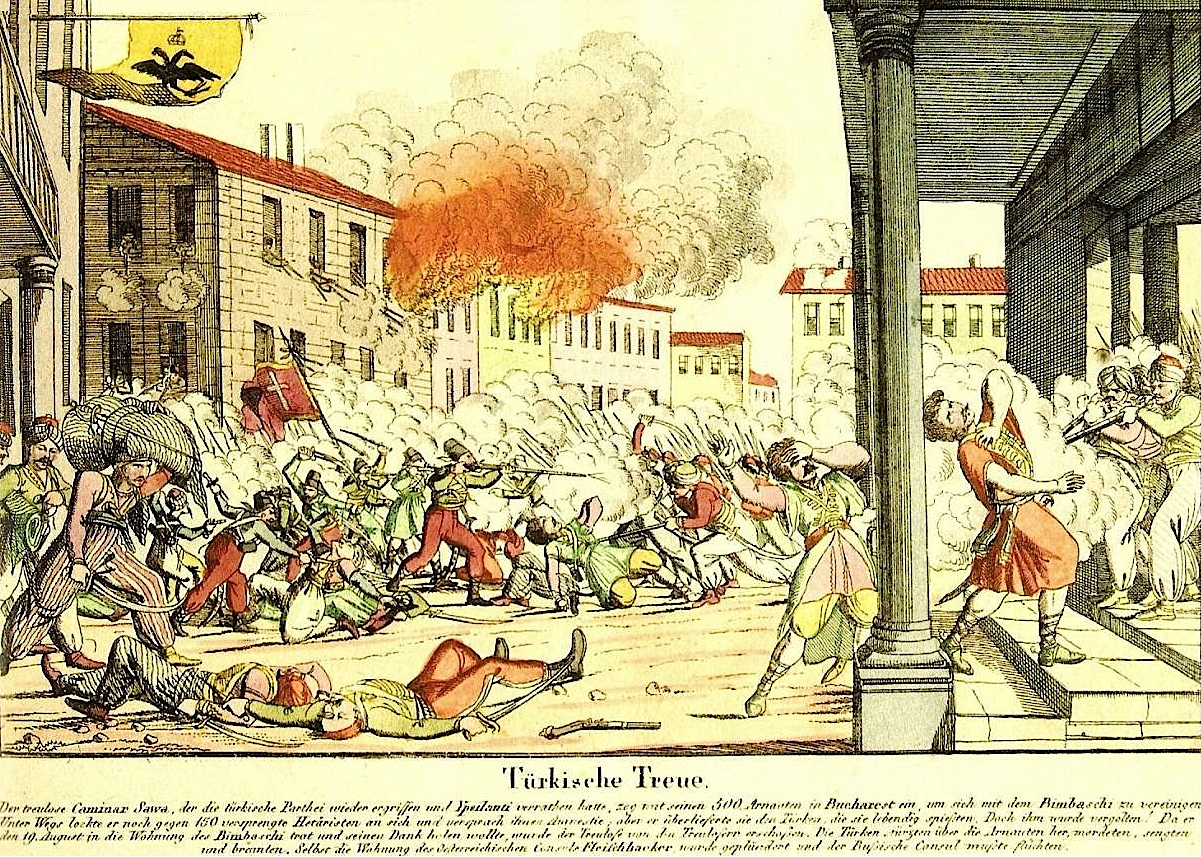
German print of 1821, depicting Sava Fochianos' Arnauts, under a cross-bearing flag, being massacred by the Ottoman Army in Bucharest

The Aristias rallied to the cause of Greek nationalism shortly before the Greek uprising of 1821. Young Aristia joined Alexander Ypsilantis's secret society, the Filiki Eteria, which slowly engineered the nationalist expedition in Moldavia and Wallachia. In late 1818 and early 1819, a new Prince, Alexandros Soutzos, allowed Aristia and his troupe to perform works of political theater, portraying the "hatred of tyranny and self-sacrifice for the fatherland"—from La Mort de César and Mérope, by Voltaire, to Iakovakis Rizos Neroulos' Aspasia. They were met with "frenetic applause, exuberance and overflowing emotions". Soutzos was troubled by this reception, and decided to ban all plays that could be construed as critiques of religion and political affairs. He was ignored by the troupe, who answered more directly to a group of Eterist conspirators; they continued with provocative stagings of plays by Voltaire and Vittorio Alfieri, until May 1820, by which time local Greeks were in full preparation for the revolution.

Aristia awaited the Eterists in Bucharest, which had been occupied by troops loyal to Tudor Vladimirescu, who led a parallel uprising of Romanians. In mid March 1821, Greeks in Bucharest, led by Giorgakis Olympios, pledged to support Ypsilantis rather than Vladimirescu. The event was marked by a large display of Greek nationalism in downtown Bucharest, the details of which were committed to writing by Constantin D. Aricescu from his interview with Aristia. The actor carried the "flag of liberty", an Eterist symbol showing Constantine the Great and Helena, alongside a cross and the slogan "In this, conquer"; the obverse showed a phoenix rising from its ashes. The ceremony ended with the banner being planted on the Bellu gate, announced to the crowds as prefiguring the future reconquest of Byzantium. Reportedly, "the flag that was carried by Mr. Aristia" was later also adopted by Sava Fochianos, who deserted to Ypsilantis' Sacred Band alongside the Bucharest garrison.

In April–August, Ypsilantis' forces were encircled and crushed by the Ottoman Army. According to various accounts, Aristia fought alongside the Sacred Band of Wallachia in their final stand at Drăgășani, side by side with a fellow actor, Spiros Drakoulis. He was seriously wounded on that battlefield, before receiving sanctuary in the Austrian Empire. He eventually settled in the Papal States, where he reportedly continued his education and became familiar with Italian theater. Performing in charity shows for destitute children, in or around 1824 he met Louis Dupré, who drew his portrait. Also at Rome, Aristia met the Earl of Guilford, and later claimed to have received his quasi-parental protection. Meanwhile, Costache's actual father had enlisted to fight for the First Hellenic Republic, and was later killed at the Siege of Missolonghi.

Returning to his native Wallachia, Aristia found work as a private tutor for young members of the Ghica family—whose patriarch, Grigore IV Ghica, had taken the Wallachian throne in 1822. His patron, Smărăndița Ghica, also asked him to stage Neoclassical plays in Greek at her Bucharest home. Regulars included the future politician and memoirist, Ion Ghica, who was also directly tutored by Aristia. According to Ghica, Aristia reserved the title roles for himself, while Smărăndița and Scarlat Ghica had supporting roles; their costumes were improvised from bed linen and old dresses. Ghica describes his teacher as an "epic" and "fiery" character, noting in passing that Aristia was also promoting the modern Western fashion, including the tailcoat, having discarded all Ottoman clothing after 1822.

This period also witnessed the first coordination between Aristia and a Wallachian writer, Ion Heliade Rădulescu. Inspired by the latter, in 1825 Aristia produced and performed in Molière's George Dandin, turning it into an anti-Phanariote manifesto. It remains the only work by Molière ever to be brought on stage in Wallachia, despite many translations of his other plays. Also in 1825, Aristia traveled to British Corfu, performing in his own Greek rendition of Voltaire's Mahomet. Sponsored by Guilford, he finally graduated from the Ionian Academy. During his time there, he staged Alfieri's Oreste, Agamemnon, and Antigone, Pietro Metastasio's Demofoonte, and Jean Racine's Andromaque. Puchner also mentions that Aristia eventually taught classes at the academy.

Economides suggests that Aristia had returned to Bucharest in 1827, joining the staff of Saint Sava College as a teacher of French; other records have him in Paris, where Aristia completed an hymn celebrating the Hellenic Republic. It was first published by Firmin Didot in 1829. Meanwhile, the anti-Ottoman trend received endorsement following the Russo-Turkish War of 1828–1829, which placed Wallachia and Moldavia under a modernizing regime, defined by the Regulamentul Organic constitution. His hymn was published as a brochure by Heliade's newspaper Curierul Românesc, which thus hinted at Romanian national emancipation. One account by Iosif Hodoșiu suggests that Aristia returned to his activities on the stage during the actual occupation, in the interval following Grigore Ghica's ouster. His "timid attempt" included shows of Alfieri's Bruto and Oreste, the latter with C. A. Rosetti as Aegisthus (displaying "such natural ferocity that he frightened the public, and even his teacher, Aristia").

=== Philharmonic Society ===
Emblem of the Philharmonic Society, 1835

Aristia's conversion to Romanian nationalism, or the "ideals of the Romanian national community", is noted by historian Nicolae Isar as being exemplary for a generation of assimilated Greeks. The poet was initially threatened by the overwhelming prestige of French culture, which marginalized Greek influence: he reportedly lost students to the new French school, founded by Jean Alexandre Vaillant. However, he compensated by exploiting his own French literary background. He is thus credited as a contributor to Heliade's Romanian version of Mahomet, which appeared in 1831. Despite his acculturation, Aristia continued to publicize the staples of "Eterist dramatic repertoire", which included both Mahomet and Lord Byron's Siege of Corinth. From November 1832, headmaster Petrache Poenaru employed Aristia to teach French and Demotic Greek at Saint Sava. He also gave informal classes in drama and had a series of student productions involving Rosetti and Ioan Emanoil Florescu; during these, Rosetti "revealed himself as a very gifted thespian".

Aristia also discovered and promoted a Bucharest-born tragedian, Ioan Tudor Curie. He continued to have an influence on fashion: most students, above all Curie and Costache Mihăileanu, imitated their teacher's every mannerism. Because of Aristia, a generation of actors "trilled and swagged", wore their hair long, and put on "garish" neckties. Students from those years included Natis Caragiale's son, Costache Caragiale, who debuted in 1835 as Curie's understudy. As reported by Curie himself, it was Aristia who took the initiative in transforming irregular theatrical classes into a more structured drama club: "He was famous artist, a good painter, an architect, a sculptor, a poet. He had great, solid ideas about each and everything. He wanted a classical theater; he proceeded by searching through the libraries of Greek monks, those who were present at Bucharest, for those books showing Arab and Jewish costumes and from these antique models he created the theater's wardrobe, sewing them together himself, out of fine cloth, [and] creating a historically accurate scene". Aristia received encouragement from the boyar nobility, who had heard of his "performing wonders" as an educator, but also from the Russian Governor-general, Pavel Kiselyov. Kiselyov visited Aristia to make sure that the gatherings were non-political in content, after which he gave his personal blessing.

By 1833, Aristia had become a regular in liberal circles, meeting with his pupil Ghica and other young intellectuals. Together with Heliade, they established a Philharmonic Society. He organized classes in acting and declamation at the Dramatic School, a branch of the Philharmonic Society. This was the first learning institution for professional acting to exist in the Balkans. Alumni included three of Wallachia's pioneer actresses, Caliopi Caragiale, Ralița Mihăileanu, and Eufrosina Popescu, as well as the future playwright Dimitrie C. Ollănescu-Ascanio. From November 1, 1835, Aristia and his mentor Heliade were editors of its mouthpiece, Gazeta Teatrului. That year, he also published a textbook on French grammar, reprinted in 1839 as Prescurtare de grammatică françozească. It was closely based on Charles Pierre Chapsal and François-Joseph-Michel Noël's Nouvelle Grammaire Française. He followed up with a series of French-language courses, including a phrase book and a translation of J. Wilm's book of moral tales.

The Philharmonic put up plays by foreigners—the only exception to this rule was a reported staging of Costache Faca's Comodia vremii, in 1835. Mahomet was a favorite with the public—Aristia did not appear in it, but served as a prompter. According to Hodoșiu, the Philharmonic had "incalculable" success with this play, which ensured that the group could count on a 2,000-ducat budget. Other productions riled up conservative sensitivities, as was the case with August von Kotzebue's Misanthropy and Repentance. It prompted Barbu Catargiu to report that the Philharmonic had failed in its stated mission of serving as the "school of morals". Aristia's subsequent work was a translation of Alfieri's Saul and Virginia, initially commissioned and produced by the same Society. It was never printed, but served as the basis for a show on December 1, 1836. He prepared, but never managed to print, Molière's Forced Marriage.

In 1837, Aristia also published his version of Homer's Iliad, which included his short biography of the author. The published version also featured Aristia's notes, outlining answers to his earliest critics, whom he called "Thersites". Wallachia's ruler Alexandru II Ghica was enthusiastic about the work, and presented Aristia with congratulations, expressed for all his subjects. This is sometimes described as the first Iliad translation into Romanian; some evidence suggests that Moldavia's Alecu Beldiman had produced another one ca. 1820, around the time when Iordache Golescu also penned a fragmentary version.

Saul was the Society's other major success: it doubled as a patriotic play, with messages that theatergoers understood to be subversively aimed at occupation by the Russian Empire. Russian envoys took offense, and the production was suspended. Its noticeable opposition to Alexandru II, and financial setbacks, put an end to the Philharmonic Society during the early months of 1837. Aristia's pupils attempted to take up similar projects, but generally failed to build themselves actual careers. Exceptions included Costache Caragiale, who was able to find employment at Botoșani in Moldavia, as well as Eufrosina Popescu and Ralița Mihăileanu, who were leading ladies in Bucharest until the late 1870s. By May 1837, Aristia himself had traveled to Moldavia, accompanying Heliade on a networking trip and hoping to coordinate efforts between dissenting intellectuals from both Principalities. Samples of his poetry were taken up in Mihail Kogălniceanu's review, Alăuta Românească.

At home, the Ghica regime continued to bestow accolades upon the poet. In 1838, he was received into boyardom after being created a Serdar; in January 1836, he had married the Romanian Lucsița Mărgăritescu. Around that time, Aristia was inhabiting a townhouse to one side of Bucharest's Lutheran Church (Luterană Street), where he also hosted the city's first state-sanctioned girls' school. His father in law, Serdar Ioan Mărgăritescu, granted the couple a vineyard in the unincorporated neighborhood of Giulești, and various assets worth 35,000 thaler. Costache and Lucsița's first-born was a son, found dead at the age of three; a daughter, Aristeea Aristia, was born to them in 1842.

Aristia's school of acting, still heavily reliant on Talma, was nominally realistic, or "somewhat naturalistic", in that it relied on substitution. However, he pushed his pupils to exaggerate, causing them "nervous wear and tear" to the point of compete exhaustion. Curie was recalled to play the lead in Saul during December 1837, and acted with such pathos that he fainted. Doctors intervened to draw blood, prompting Heliade to remark that Curie had "shed his blood for the honor of Romanian theater". Reportedly, some at Ghica's court were impressed by the event, and inquired about "the emperor" Curie's health. Although the play could go back into production from January 1838, and also taken up by Caragiale's troupe in Moldavia, Heliade and Aristia's activity was interrupted by major setbacks. As reported by Hodoșiu, "indirect persecutions", showing Alexandru II's mounting jealousy, but also conflicts within the Society itself, again brought Aristia's work to a standstill. The Philharmonic ceased functioning when Ieronimo Momolo ended their lease on his theater hall.

=== Athens sojourn and 1848 Revolution ===
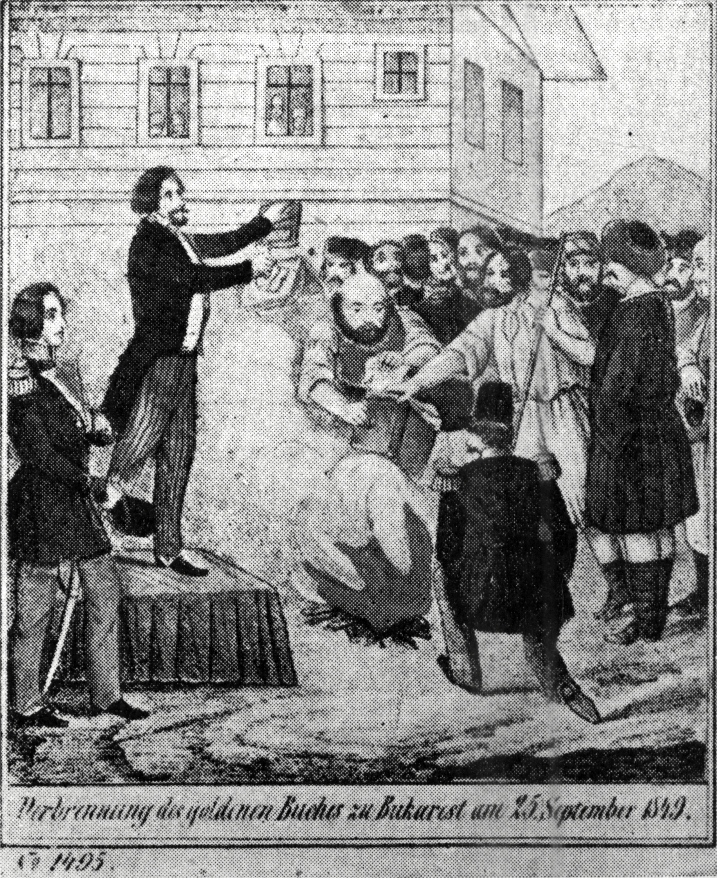
Print showing the public burning of Regulamentul Organic in September 1848

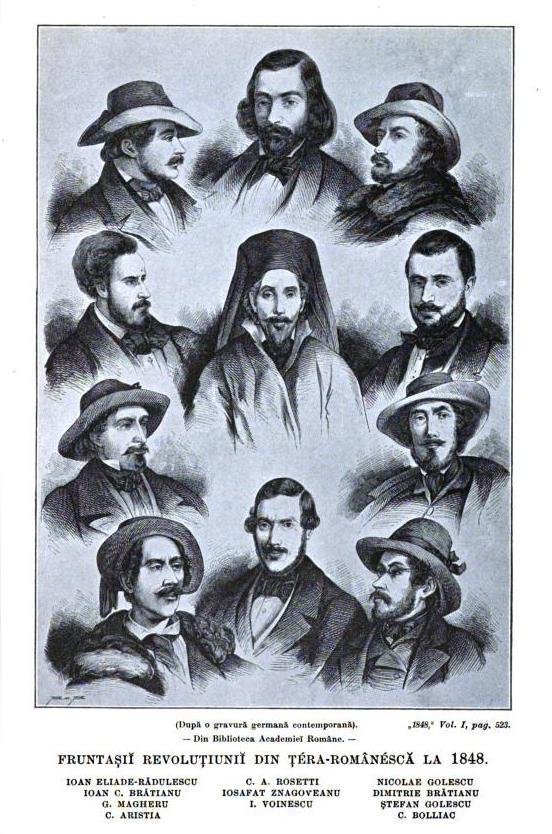
Leaders of the Wallachian uprising in a contemporary group portrait; Aristia is bottom left, and Ion Heliade Rădulescu top left

By 1839, Prince Ghica had engineered Heliade's political marginalization; the only two Heliade loyalists to still declare publicly were Poenaru and Aristia. During those months, the conservative schoolteacher Ioan Maiorescu published a detailed critique of Wallachia's educational system, prompting Aristia to take up its defense. Around that time, Aristia and Curie went on a theatrical tour of the Kingdom of Greece, where the former set up a Philodramatic Society. His cultural manifesto, addressed to the Greek people, was published on 25 September 1840. It won him instant support from other former Eterists relocated to Athens, including his mentor Rizos Neroulos, as well as from the deposed Prince John Caradja. Aristia's text was a critique of melodrama as favored by the foreign courtiers of King Otto, attracting their opposition to his projects; they promoted Aristia's rival, Theodoros Orfanidis. Aristia and is troupe are only known to have performed a single play in Athens. This was Aristodemo, by Vincenzo Monti, which he himself translated into Greek; it premiered on 24 November 1840. According to one anecdote, Aristia "so very much scared those dames of reborn Hellada with the realism of his acting, that some just fainted."

Also in 1840, a printing press in Athens put out Aristia's only original work of drama, the tragedy Αρμόδιος και Ἀριστογείτων ("Harmodius and Aristogeiton"). Dissatisfied with the Ottonian regime, the author privately confessed that he longed to make his definitive return to Wallachia, "among those good Dacians". He did so before October 1843, and served as co-editor of Poenaru's newspaper, Învățătorul Satului. This was the first publication specifically aimed at educating Wallachia's peasants, and was distributed by rural schools. Aristia held his own column in the form of "moralizing tales", Datoriile omului ("Man's Duties"), sometimes inspired by historical episodes from the times of Mircea the Elder and Matei Basarab. These alternated "careful pledges of submission to law and the authorities" with "critical notes against injustice and abuse by those in power." Curie, meanwhile, opted not to return to his homeland, signing for the French Foreign Legion; he later settled in Moldavia.

Those years also witnessed Aristia's enthusiasm for political change in Wallachia: also in 1843, he published Prințul român ("The Romanian Prince"), which comprises encomiums for Gheorghe Bibescu, winner of the recent princely election. This was followed in 1847 by a similar work on Marițica Bibescu, published as Doamna Maria ("Lady Maria"). In 1845, he had also produced a third and expanded edition of his work on French grammar. He was nevertheless struggling to make ends meet. By 1847, his two Bucharest homes had been taken by his creditors, and Lucsița had prevented his access to her dowry. Despite his participation in the princely cult, Aristia was being driven into the camp opposing Bibescu's relative conservatism. He now "totally integrated" within the Romanian national movement, emerging as a member of the liberal conspiratorial society, Frăția. Historian Mircea Birtz hypothesizes that he was also initiated into the Romanian Freemasonry, but notes that the organization itself never claimed him. According to historian Dumitru Popovici, Aristia was aware of how his non-Romanianness clashed with revolutionary ideals; like Caragiale and Cezar Bolliac, he compensated with "grandiloquent gestures" that would display his affinities with locals.

The poet reached his political prominence in June 1848, with the momentary victory of the Wallachian Revolution. During the original uprising, he agitated among Bucharest's citizens, reciting "revolutionary hymns". Following Bibescu's ouster, the Provisional Government established a National Guard, and organized a contest to select its commander. Papazoglu recalls that Aristia was the first Guard commander, elected by the Bucharest citizenry with an acclamation on the field of Filaret. Other accounts suggest that Aristia presented himself as a candidate, but lost to government favorite Scarlat Crețulescu, and was only appointed a regular member for one Bucharest's five defense committees. According to Aricescu, Aristia and Nicolae Teologu were supported by the populace, who gathered at Filaret to protest against Crețulescu's selection. This prompted the authorities to censure them with a proclamation against "anarchy"; as read by Aricescu, the document proved that Aristia and Teologu, as Heliade disciples, were less left-wing than Rosetti and other "demagogues", who made up most of the revolutionary cabinet.

On July 7 (Old Style: June 25), Crețulescu resigned, freeing his seat for Aristia. According to Papazoglu, entire sections of the National Guard existed only on paper. Those that did exist comprised regular members of the city guilds in their work uniforms, who amused the populace with their poor military training. During his period as a revolutionary officer, Aristia himself helped carry out the clampdown on Bibescu loyalists. According to Heliade, the reactionary leader Ioan Solomon was captured by "Constantin Aristias, a colonel in the national guard, who enjoyed the People's great confidence". Heliade claims that Aristia saved Solomon from a near-lynching, ordering his protective imprisonment at Cernica. Another target of revolutionary vengeance was Grigore Lăcusteanu, whose memoirs recall an encounter with "Aristia (hitherto a demented acting coach) and one Apoloni, armed to their teeth, their hats festooned with feathers." Lăcusteanu also claims that he easily tricked Aristia into allowing him to lodge with a friend, Constantin A. Crețulescu, instead of being moved into an actual prison.

Shortly after, Aristia resigned and was replaced with Teologu. He remained enlisted with the Guard, helping its new commander with the reorganization. According to one later record, Aristia also served as a revolutionary Prefect of Ilfov County (which included Bucharest). Învățătorul Satului, directed by the radical Nicolae Bălcescu from July 1848, employed the poet on its editorial team. Over three issues, it published his unabashed political essay, Despre libertate ("On Liberty"). In September, the Revolution itself took a more radical turn: at a public rally on September 18 (O. S.: September 6), Regulamentul Organic and Arhondologia (the register of titles and ranks) were publicly burned. Aristia and Bolliac participated in this event and gave "firebrand speeches." As reported by Colonel Voinescu, the conservative memoirist, the "ridiculous parody" was entirely organized by "a Greek man, namely C. Aristia". Voinescu muses: "What should we call such an act? Which nation has ever set fire to its own laws before even making herself some new ones! but there is some consolation in the knowledge that the chief leader of this display was a Greek."

=== Imprisonment, deportation, and return ===
The drift into radicalism was finally curbed by a new Ottoman intervention, which ended the Revolution altogether. As leader of the occupation force, Mehmed Fuad Pasha ordered a roundup of revolutionaries. Aristia was imprisoned at Cotroceni Monastery, part of a prison population which also included Bălcescu, Bolliac, Rosetti, Ion C. Brătianu, Ștefan Golescu, Iosafat Snagoveanu, and various others; people less implicated in the events, such as Dimitrie Ghica, were released back into society. On September 24, Fuad and Constantin Cantacuzino signed an order to banish Aristia and other rebels from Wallachia. The early leg of his deportation journey was a boat trip up the Danube, alongside his fellow poet-revolutionary Dimitrie Bolintineanu, as well Bolliac, Snagoveanu, Ștefan Golescu, Nicolae Golescu, Alexandru Golescu-Albu, and Grigore Grădișteanu. Outside Vidin, Aristia wanted to pass the time by reciting from Saul, before being struck down by his Turkish guard—unfamiliar with theater, he feared that Aristia had gone insane.

According to one account, Aristia was due to be executed alongside other radicals, but got hold of the firman and was able to modify its text before it reached his would-be executioners. Other reports note the intervention of United Kingdom diplomats, including Effingham Grant, who feared that Aristia and the others would end up as Ottoman prisoners in Istanbul, or handed over to the Russians. In October, Grant met the hostages near Vidin, noting that they were "in a most wretched state". Aristia was finally taken with the other exiles to Ada Kaleh, some 160 kilometers upstream, where the revolutionaries negotiated crossing into Austrian territory by way of Semlin—in effect, an escape from custody. Eventually, the group came ashore into a rural part of the Banat, controlled by local Romanians, who defended the Austrian cause against the breakaway Hungarian revolutionaries; Snagoveanu was able to persuade the peasants that the new arrivals, though revolutionary exiles, were not friends of the Hungarians, and that they could be granted safe conduct.

The second part of the journey took Aristia into Austrian Transylvania, alongside Ion Ionescu de la Brad. The latter recalled in 1850: "I had the misfortune of spending 40 days on the Danube with this creature [Aristia], and then on our way to Brașov we almost wrestled over me jibing at Heliade and the Phanariotes." A committed supporter of Heliade's post-revolutionary faction, Aristia successively lived in Brașov, Paris, Istanbul, and Athens. In February 1849, "Provisional Government members and delegates of the Romanian emigration", including Heliade and Aristia, signed a letter of protest addressed primarily to the Frankfurt Parliament, asking for an international opposition to Russian intrusion into Wallachian political life. They asserted: "As tributaries of the Sublime Porte and [in that] autonomous, Romanians, having fulfilled all their obligations toward the Ottoman Court, can now only place themselves under the protections of those powers interested in Turkish independence."

Aristia took Heliade's part in his conflict with fellow exile Bălcescu, accusing the latter of having squandered funds collected for the revolutionary cause. In July 1849, a common resolution by the Russian and Ottoman governments named him among the 34 individuals "who have taken part in the disorders of Wallachia", and whose entry in either Principality was to be prevented by force. A report by Alexandru Golescu-Arăpilă informs that in May 1850 Aristia was stranded in Vienna, unable to continue his European journeys after a financial "blunder". As noted by the same Arăpilă, such episodes did not prevent Aristia from presenting the financial situation of revolutionary cells in unrealistic terms, and to promise wonders (monts et merveilles). The poet had refused an offer of naturalization by Greece, and instead was seeking to follow Heliade's example and begin serving the Ottomans; for this reason, he traveled to Ruschuk.

Aristia also made ample efforts to be allowed back into Wallachia—Bibescu's brother, Barbu Dimitrie Știrbei, was by then the country's reigning Prince. By July 1850, Aristia had written several letters to both Știrbei and his Ottoman supervisors asking that he and his wife be forgiven. These letters show that he had buried two children and had one living daughter, Aristeea Aristia, as "my only fortune in this world." Știrbei gave his approval, and on September 13 a decree was issued allowing him and his family to cross the border; they did so in 1851. He now helped establish the prototype National Theater Bucharest. Together with Costache Caragiale, he participated in the very first production of a play by that institution, on December 31, 1851. The family moved back into their home at Giulești, where they began tending to their vineyard and opened a number of sand mines. The property increased from various purchases, but Aristia donated some of the plots to low-income families.

Aristia returned to print in 1853 with a series of moral tales, Săteanul creștin ("The Christian Villager"). It carried a dedication to the Princess-consort, Elisabeta Cantacuzino-Știrbei. Aristia continued to be active during Știrbei's second reign, which began in October 1854. That year, his scattered poems were collected in an almanac put out by the Romanians of Großwardein. For a while in September 1855, the Prince considered making Aristia his State Librarian. Becoming a Caimacam (Regent) in 1856, after the Crimean War had put an end to Russian interventions, Alexandru II Ghica finally awarded him that same office. In 1857–1858, he and Carol Valștain, as employees of the fledgling Wallachian National Museum, worked to recover and store art bequeathed by Barbu Iscovescu, a painter and revolutionary figure who had died in exile at Pera. Săteanul creștin was followed in 1857 by a first volume from Plutarch's Parallel Lives, including a biographical essay by Dominique Ricard. As he explained in an announcement put out by Foaia pentru Minte, Anima si Literatura, this activity had consumed him for the previous four years. He also credited its success to grants awarded by two Wallachian Ministers of Education—his former enemy Scarlat Crețulescu, and his one-time Philharmonic colleague, Ioan Câmpineanu.

=== Final activities ===
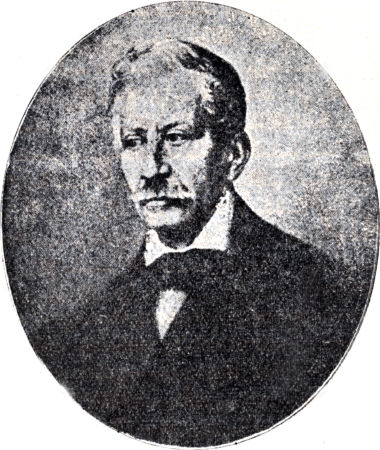
Aristia in old age

Though resuming his literary activities, Aristia declared himself frustrated in his work as a translator by the lack of a literary standard, including in matters of Romanian Cyrillic orthography. He considered giving up on this activity. Also in 1857, after being contacted by the British and Foreign Bible Society (BFBS), Aristia began work on a Romanian Bible, for which he took on the signature "K. Aristias". He used the "latest Greek edition", verified against the Masoretic Text. Three volumes, comprising all text between Genesis and Isaiah, was published in 1859 as Biblia Sacra. In parallel, his Iliad had reached he Duchy of Bukovina, acquired by Eudoxiu Hurmuzachi; in this version, it served to familiarize Mihai Eminescu, the future poet, with Homer's work. However, Aristia rejected his own translation, and had by then produced a new one, ultimately published in 1858.

In January 1859, Wallachia was effectively merged with Moldavia into the United Principalities, as the nucleus of modern Romania. Under this new regime, Aristia was again confirmed as a teacher of French and Greek at Saint Sava, though some records also suggest that he only taught Greek at Gheorghe Lazăr Gymnasium, from 1860 to 1865. Also in 1859, Aristia published his final original work of verse, Cântare. Written from the point of view of children in an orphanage, it honored the musician and philanthropist Elisa Blaremberg. His status was declining: by the 1850s, his and Talma's style of acting were being purged from theaters by a more realistic school, whose leading exponents were Matei Millo and Mihail Pascaly. In 1860, the BFBS ended its contract with Aristia, who was demanding ever-increasing funds, and whose libertine lifestyle was viewed as distasteful by local missionaries. P. Teulescu of the National Archives employed him as a translator of Greek Wallachian documents from the age of Constantine Mavrocordatos. As noted by historian Nicolae Iorga, the activity fit in with Aristia's talents, as "something he was good at" (Iorga's italics).

In 1864, Costache and Lucsița Aristia were living on Stejar Street. They declared themselves "of Hellenic origin, of Romanian birth, [and] of Christian Orthodox religion". His daughter Aristeea married the biologist Dimitrie Ananescu that same year; the younger Alexandrina was from 1871 the wife of Alexandru Radu Vardalah. Following the transformation of Saint Sava, Costache was assigned a chair at the new University of Bucharest, but resigned in favor of his pupil Epaminonda Francudi. In the 1870s part of his Giulești vineyard was taken over by the Romanian state.

Aristia was largely inactive during the final two decades of his life. In April 1867, he endorsed Constantin Dimitriade's effort to introduce more rigorous acting through a translation of Joaquín Bastús' manual, Tratado de Declamación. It appeared that same year, but proved to be "tedious, complicated, and quickly outdated." One other exception was an 1868 article for Ateneul Român, where he campaigned for the adaptation of Romanian poetry to classical hexameters. That same year, Bolliac's newspaper, Trompetta Carpaților, asked Romanian authorities to sponsor Aristia's complete translation of the Iliad, including its eventual publication. This stance was being largely ignored by the new cultural mainstream, formed around Junimea, which favored the shedding of Latin prosody in favor of more natural patterns. In a February 1876 issue of Convorbiri Literare, Junimist Ștefan Vârgolici described some of Aristia's lyrics as "very poorly written and very badly cadenced". The group also promoted a less pretentious version of the Iliad, as provided by its member, Ioan D. Caragiani.

Completely blind from 1872, Aristia dictated his final poem, written in memory of philanthropist Ana Davila, accidentally poisoned in 1874. In May 1876, he received from the Romanian state the Bene Merenti Medal, First class, at the same time as Grigore Alexandrescu, Dora d'Istria, and Aaron Florian. Beginning that year, the Aristias rented a home on Sfinții Voievozi Street, west of Podul Mogoșoaiei, where Costache hosted a literary salon. As noted by his grandson Constantin D. Ananescu, the aging and debilitated poet still rejoiced upon witnessing Romania's full emancipation from the Ottoman Empire with the 1877–1878 War of Independence. He died in his Sfinții Voievozi home on 18 April 1880, after an "apoplexy". His body was taken for burial at Sfânta Vineri Cemetery. The state treasury provided 1000 lei for his "very austere" funeral.

== Literary work ==
Aristia was widely seen as an important figure in the early modernizing stages of Romanian literature. Speaking out against Junimea in 1902, poet Alexandru Macedonski asserted the role played by Heliade and his "constellation", including Aristia, with activating the "rejuvenation age" in Wallachia and Romania. Among his later commentators, Walter Puchner argues that Aristia was personally responsible for unifying the early traditions of modern Greek and Romanian theater. A similar point is made by comparatist Cornelia Papacostea-Danielopolu, according to whom Aristia's activity in Greece "revived theatrical productions during the revolutionary period", while his work with the Ghica children signified the "origin of modern Romanian theater." Philologist Federico Donatiello notes that Heliade and Aristia had a "keen interest" in transposing the theatrical canon of the Age of Enlightenment into Romanian adaptations. Despite Aristia's Neoclassical references, literary historian George Călinescu lists him as one of Wallachia's first Romantic poets—alongside Heliade, Rosetti, Alexandrescu, Vasile Cârlova, and Grigore Pleșoianu. Theatrologist Florin Tornea also describes Aristia's acting as "murky [and] romantic".

While his talents as an animator garnered praise, his lyrical work was a topic of debate and scandal. Early on, his poetry in Greek raised a political issue. Writing in 1853, philologist Alexandre Timoni noted that Aristia's hymn to Greece "lacked inspiration", but nonetheless had a "remarkable style." Dedicated to Adamantios Korais, this poem called on the great powers to intervene and rescue the country from Ottoman subjection. Aristia produced the image of Greece as a source of civilization, a sun around which all other countries revolved as "planets". According to Timoni, the hymn was an unfortunate choice of words: "it is this new kind of sun which, for all its splendor, rotates around [the planets]." Aristia's other work in Greek, Αρμόδιος και Ἀριστογείτων, expanded upon a lyrical fragment from Andreas Kalvos, and similarly alluded to Greek liberation; it was dedicated to the Eterist Georgios Leventis.

Aristia wrote during the modernization of the Romanian vernacular, but before the definition of standard literary language and Latin-based alphabet. Before his temporary disenchantment and pause, he considered Romanian especially apt for translating literature, for being "robust" as well as "receptive of new things". In addition to being politically divisive, Aristia's version of Saul was stylistically controversial. Its language was defended with an erudite chronicle by Heliade himself, and was much treasured by the aspiring Moldavian novelist, Constantin Negruzzi. Aristia, who declared himself interested in rendering the language particular to the "pontiffs of poetry", innovated the Romanian lexis. Saul had a mixture of archaic terms, especially from Christian sermons, and new borrowings from the other Romance languages. At this stage, Aristia focused on accuracy and precision, and refrained from adhering to Heliade's more heavily Italienized idiom; his version of the Romanian Cyrillic alphabet was also simplified, with the removal of any superfluous characters. According to Călinescu, the result was still somewhat prolix, and the vocabulary "bizarre", mainly because "Aristia has not mastered Romanian".

Literary historian N. Roman dismisses Prințul român as "confusing and embarrassing verse". In "pompous style", it depicted the minutiae of Bibescu's coronation, and defined Bibescu as the paragon of patriotism, on par with Theseus, Lycurgus of Sparta, Marcus Furius Camillus, and Attila. A fragment suggested the "main direction of princely propaganda", by identifying Bibescu with a 16th-century national hero, Michael the Brave. An unknown Russian chronicler in Das Ausland magazine ridiculed the poet for "unleash[ing] all his poetic energy on Bibescu's horse", and claimed that this aspect also annoyed the Prince himself. Aristia expected the book to be known and praised by his Moldavian colleagues, to whom he sent free copies. Instead, Prințul român was "mercilessly" panned by the celebrated Moldavian poet, Vasile Alecsandri, in an 1844 review for Propășirea. It read: "Clap your hands, my fellow Romanians, for at long last, after a long, long wait [Alecsandri's italics] that took some thousands of years, you have proven yourselves worthy of receiving an epic poem! [...] This golden age of yours has arrived as an 8º tome that's packed full of wriggled verse and of ideas even more wriggled."

The first drafts of the Iliad in Aristia's interpretation were criticized for their coinage of composite words—ridiculed examples include pedeveloce ("fast-running") and braț-alba ("white-armed"); more such words also appeared in the 1850s version: coiflucerinde ("helmet-shining"), pedager ("quick-footed"), and cai-domitoriu ("horse-taming"). His inventions also included the vocative zee, for "O goddess", in the very first line of the epic. Petre Gheorghe Bârlea describes zee as a precious contribution, superior to the Slavic-sounding zeițo, which was retained in the version penned in 1920 by George Murnu. He notes that, overall, Aristia "decided to cut off literary Romanian from that vast and heterogeneous field that is everyday language". Linguist Lazăr Șăineanu likens the artificial project to that undertaken in 16th-century French literature by Du Bartas and La Pléiade.

Aristia's revised Iliad is viewed as "unintelligible" to more modern readers, "in a language that is new, harmonious, enchanting, but is not Romanian." According to the critic Ioan Duma, Aristia's care in answering his detractors was misdirected, since his translation remained "vacuous"; scholar Nicolae Bănescu also highlights the issue of Aristia "tortur[ing] language". Călinescu sees Aristia's text as a "masterpiece in extravagance", a "caricature-like answer" to more professional translations by Nikolay Gnedich and Johann Heinrich Voss. The effort was criticized on such grounds by Heliade himself, who "still preserved his common sense." However, as scholar Gheorghe Bogdan-Duică notes, Aristia's applied talents "did wonders" for advancing the Romanian literary effort. Bârlea defends Aristia against his "many critics", especially those who, like Nicolae Iorga, spoke from "literary pride, having tried, in various takes, their own Homeric translations."

Aristia's efforts in enriching the Romanian lexis were also directed to non-lyrical pursuits, as with his version of Plutarch and its 24-page glossary. The standard proposed here was profusely Italienized, with some Greek calques added. The preface also included a first instance of the word viaticum, borrowed from Latin in its original meaning, "provision for a journey". Aristia's project in Bible translation may have been inspired by Heliade's earlier attempts. According to Birtz, he refrained from following Heliade's heretical speculation, and was thus deemed palatable by the Wallachian Orthodox Church. His overall involvement in Christian literature was touched by additional controversy, particularly regarding its depiction of Longinus as both a Romanian and the "first Christian". Scholar Mihail Kogălniceanu identified this as a "maniacal" exaggeration which "does not befit a Romanian", and which was prone to make nationalism look ridiculous.

== Legacy ==
The poet was survived by Aristeea Ananescu, his other daughter having died before him. Bucharesters preserved a record of the deceased writer in the name they assigned to his former property, as Gropile Aristia or Gropile lui Aristia ("Aristia's Pits"). In 1891, a sanitation committee, presided upon by Alfred Bernard-Lendway, found that the remaining pits had gathered toxic water and were a source of malaria; the area was condemned and the pits were covered up. Lucsița sold off the remainder of her husband's vineyard and mines to an entrepreneur named Viting, but her inheritors litigated the matter until ca. 1940. By then, the family house had been demolished to build a hospital for the State Railways Company, though the general area was still known for its namesake writer.

Writing in January 1914, Ananescu noted that no arrangements had ever been made for his grandfather's centennial in 1900. This gaffe, he notes, was remedied in 1903, when Ollănescu-Ascanio produced a short historical play in which Aristia was a leading role. The Aristia archive was by then mostly lost, as were most copies of Biblia Sacra, but his Saul was recovered and partly published by scholar Ramiro Ortiz in 1916. By 1919, the boys' school on Bucharest's Francmasonă (or Farmazonă) Street had been renamed after the poet.

Aristia received renewed interest during the Romanian communist regime, when he was occasionally celebrated as a progressive figure. He appears as a character in Camil Petrescu's 1953 novel, Un om între oameni—his "sentimental biography" provides the author with a pretext for discussing the world of theater and its political leanings and morals before and during 1848. In April 1955, the National Theater Bucharest and its star artist, Costache Antoniu, publicly commemorated 75 years since Aristia's death.
