= De Brave Hendrik =

Coordinates: 51°51′8.74″N 4°38′28.46″E

- Interactive map of De Brave Hendrik

Restaurant information
- Established: 1982
- Closed: ca. 1997
- Head chef: Jan Klein
- Food type: French
- Rating: Michelin Guide
- Location: Kerkstraat 30, Hendrik-Ido-Ambacht, 3601 CC, Netherlands

De Brave Hendrik was a fine dining restaurant in Hendrik-Ido-Ambacht, Netherlands. It was awarded one Michelin star in 1990 and retained that rating until 1996.

== History ==
The restaurant was originally named In Den Braven Hendrik and located at Kerkstraat 7. This building was originally home to H.I. Ambacht's technical drawing school "Vakteekenschool". Later the restaurant renamed to De Brave Hendrik and housed at Kerkstraat 30.

Henk van Ark and head chef Jan Klein owned the restaurant from 1982 until 1994, when Klein left to start restaurant Hermitage in Rijsoord. In 1996, the restaurant became the second restaurant in the Netherlands to voluntarily give up its Michelin star. Restaurant 't Misverstant did this in 1994.

The restaurant closed down around 1997. A restaurant Sandelingen occupied the structure on Kerkstraat 30 before the structure returned to residential purposes. Kerkstraat 7 continues to house restaurants through 2023.

The name is after a popular textbook for teaching beginner readers in Dutch published in 1809 by Nicolaas Anslijn.

== See also ==
- List of Michelin starred restaurants in the Netherlands
