= Eufrosina Popescu =

Romanian actor (1821–1900)

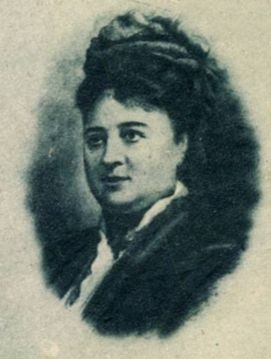
Eufrosina Popescu

Eufrosina Popescu (October 20, 1821, in Bucharest – 1900, in Fetești) was a Wallachian, later Romanian actress. She belonged to the first generation of professional actors in Romania.

A native of Bucharest, her parents were the boyar Vlasto and his wife Maria. At the age of sixteen, she married the army officer Theodor Popescu. She studied music and acting at Societatea filarmonică, the first dramatic school in Romania, established by Costache Aristia, the pioneer and founder of the Romanian theater, in 1833. Alongside Costache Caragiale, she belonged to the first generation of professional actors educated there, and active in Romania. She performed parts within the Romanian drama of Vasile Alecsandri, V.A. Urechia, Gheorghe Sion and Alexandru Macedonski, as well as classical international plays. Under the name Eufrosina Marcolini, she also toured Europe, especially Italy, where she became quite popular. After the 1859 Union of the Principalities, she returned home. There, she appeared on stage, successively, with Mihail Pascaly and Matei Millo.
