= François Noël =

François Noël may refer to:

- François Noël (missionary) (1651–1729), Flemish missionary and translator
- François-Joseph-Michel Noël (1756–1841), French diplomat and author

== See also ==
- François-Noël Babeuf, 18th-century French journalist and agitator
