= Nicolaas Anslijn =

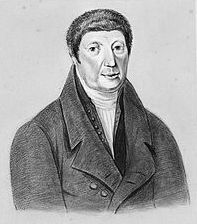

Nicolaas Anslijn (12 June 1777 – 18 September 1838) was a Dutch writer, illustrator, and teacher. He wrote several school textbooks including one on natural history, a subject he liked to teach. He collected specimens of natural history. His most popular book was De brave Hendrik (1809) which went into numerous prints and was a popular children's book. The protagonist of the book was a boy named Hendrik with manners considered appropriate at the time. In 1810, he wrote De brave Maria with a girl character.

Anslijn was born in Leiden, the eldest son of bookbinder Nicolaas and Elisabeth Bols. He grew up in Amsterdam along with six other siblings who all learned to read and write from their grandfather, a teacher. With an interest in drawing and painting Anslijn considered becoming an artist but his father had him work as an apprentice at the bookbinding shop. He gained proficiency in the work in 1788 and his father then allowed him to pursue art training. In 1789, the father drowned while walking in a dense fog. The family was pushed into financial troubles and Anslijn quit his art training and began to work with a varnishing business that involved travelling to fairs around the country. He quit this and returned to Leiden and began to work again as a bookbinder. He married Japikje Jacoba Heek in 1800 and they would have four children. In 1802 he trained as a teacher while also working as a bookbinder and received a teaching diploma in 1803. He worked at a poor school in the evenings and then moved to Amsterdam in 1804. He then moved to Haarlem in 1807. He became well known as a teacher, and developed methods of teaching based on Johann Heinrich Pestalozzi. He also wrote several textbook on language, math, history, geography and biology. His school was visited by François-Joseph-Michel Noël and Georges Cuvier in 1810 who were examining the state of education and they praised the approach used. In 1819 he left work as a headmaster and taught wealthy pupils as a private tutor. In 1834, his wife died and he moved from Haarlem to Alkmar where he lived with his son Pieter Daniel who was a school teacher. Anslijn died of a stroke while drawing illustrations for a book on the medicinal plants of the Netherlands.
