= Stolniceni-Prăjescu =

- Commune
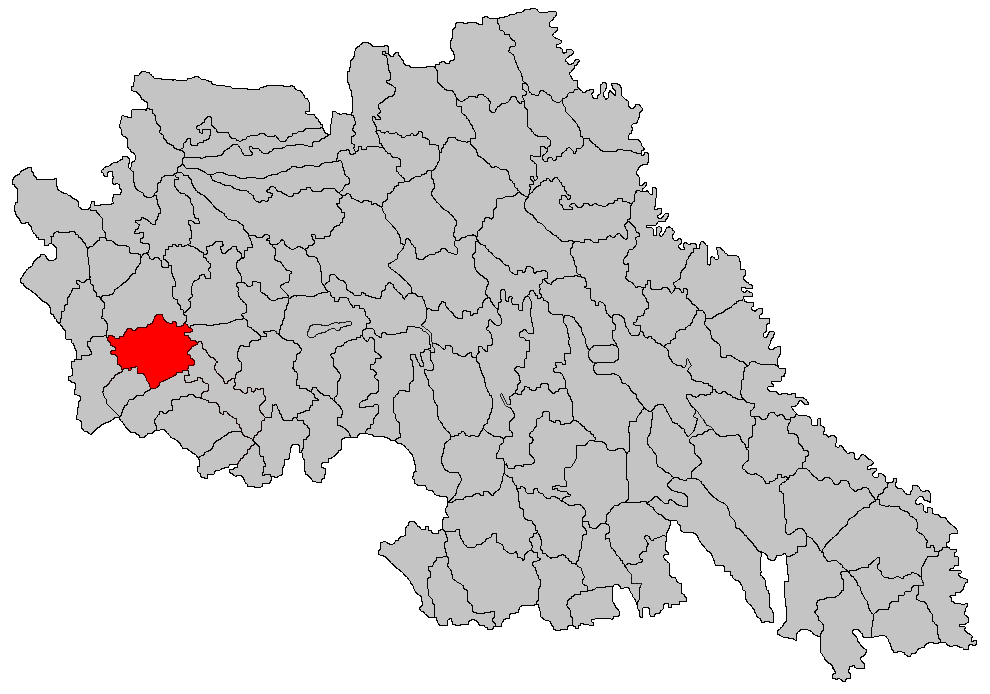
- Location in Iași County

- Location in Romania
- Coordinates: 47°12′N 26°44′E
- Country: Romania
- County: Iași
- Subdivisions: Stolniceni-Prăjescu, Brătești, Cozmești

Government
  - Mayor (2024–2028): Costel Hugianu (PSD)
- Area: 63.47 km^{2} (24.51 sq mi)
- Elevation: 236 m (774 ft)
- Population (2021-12-01): 4,550
  - Density: 71.7/km^{2} (186/sq mi)
- Time zone: UTC+02:00 (EET)
  - Summer (DST): UTC+03:00 (EEST)
- Postal code: 707460
- Area code: +(40) x32
- Vehicle reg.: IS
- Website: stolniceni.ro

Stolniceni-Prăjescu is a commune in Iași County, Western Moldavia, Romania. It is composed of three villages: Brătești, Cozmești, and Stolniceni-Prăjescu.

== Natives ==
- Matei Millo (1813 or 1814 – 1896), stage actor, singer, producer, and playwright
