= Joaquín Bastús =

Spanish writer and pedagogue

Joaquín Bastús (1799–1873) was a Spanish writer and pedagogue. He wrote the Diccionario Histórico Enciclopédico.
