= Charles Pierre Chapsal =

French grammarian

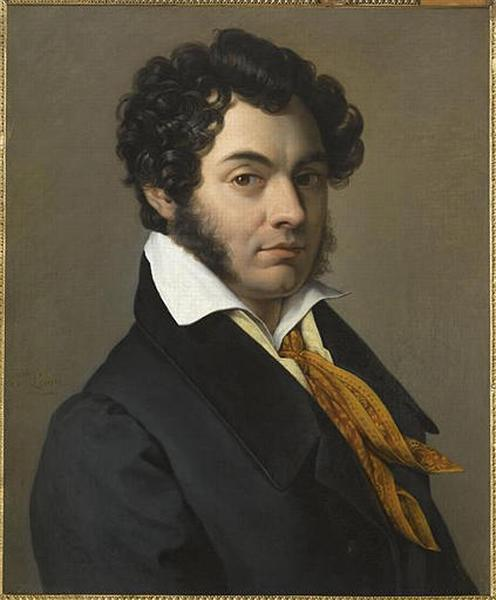
Portrait of Charles-Pierre Chapsal by Sophie Lemire

Charles Pierre Chapsal (1787–1858) was a French grammarian, editor of the Classics and a founding member in 1821 of the Société de Géographie.

Chapsal was born in Paris and taught at the Collège Louis-le-Grand. His principal work was his Nouvelle Grammaire Française in which he collaborated with François-Joseph-Michel Noël. The work was more complete and more logical than the previous standard grammar of Charles François Lhomond; it first appeared in 1823, and by the time of the author's death it had passed through more than forty editions, eighty by 1889.

On the proceeds of his early labour, Chapsal was able to retire to the Château de Polangis, near Joinville-le-Pont, where he became a benefactor of the commune and mayor 1843-48, 1850-58. He died in Paris in 1858 and bequeathed a sum of 80,000 francs to be distributed in the banlieues of Paris.

Translations were printed in the United States, by Moss (Philadelphia, 1878) and an abridgment based on the authors' own, which had been published in 1826, by Lockwood (New York, 1869).
