= 't Misverstant =

Coordinates: 51°41′14.37″N 5°18′16.44″E

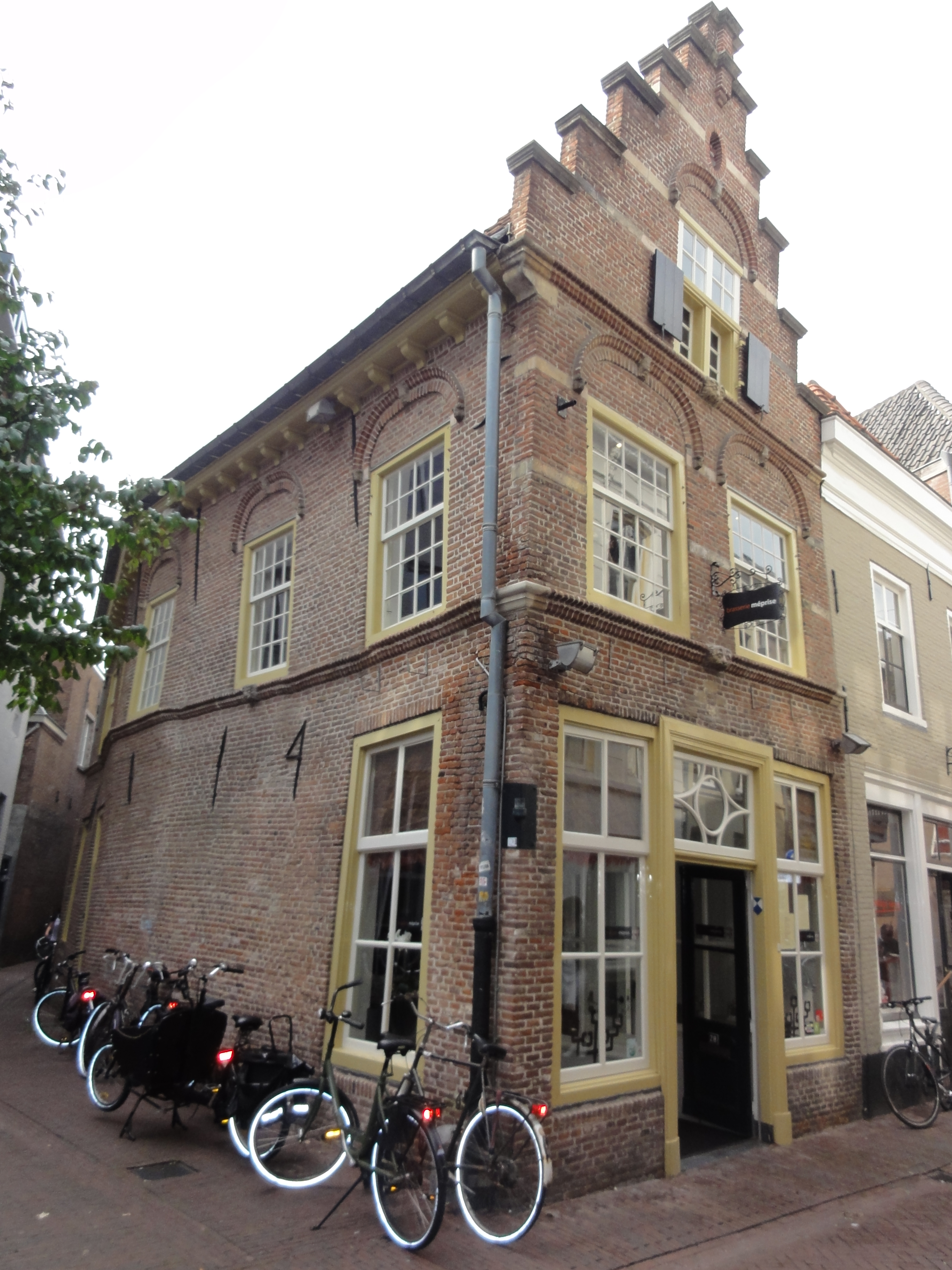
- Snellestraat 28
- Interactive map of 't Misverstant

Restaurant information
- Established: 1976
- Closed: 1995
- Head chef: Alexander Koene
- Food type: French
- Rating: Michelin Guide
- Location: Snellestraat 28, Den Bosch, 5211 HT, Netherlands
- Seating capacity: 48
- Website: Official website

Restaurant 't Misverstant is a restaurant in Den Bosch, Netherlands. It was a fine dining restaurant that was awarded one Michelin star in 1984 and retained that rating until 1995.

The star was gained under the leadership of head chef Alexander Koene He voluntarily gave up the Michelin star due to the immense pressure related to it, effectively closing down the restaurant by turning it into a bistro

== See also ==
- List of Michelin starred restaurants in the Netherlands
