= Niccolò Livaditti =

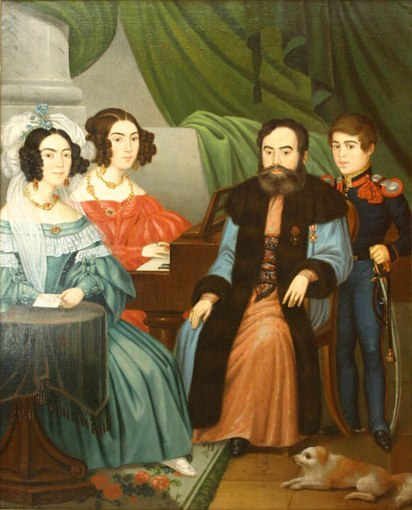
Vornic Vasile Alecsandri (1792-1854) and his family

Niccolò Livaditti (1804, Trieste – 12 June 1858, Iași) was an Austrian Empire-born naïve painter, who worked in the Principality of Moldavia.

== Biography ==
He was born to a wealthy Greek family, and took part in the Carbonari uprisings. When they failed, he was forced to flee Italy. Sometime shortly before 1830, he arrived in Iași with a troupe of French actors. He and his wife, Carlotta, a Spanish Catholic, decided to settle there. His first known painting dates from 1830: a portrait of the Boyar, Anastasie Bașotă.

Within a few years, he was the most popular portrait painter among the upper classes in Iași. He was especially well known for his group portraits of families. His fame spread, so he eventually had clients in Hârlău, Botoșani, Dorohoi and Roman as well.

În 1832, the brothers Joseph and Baptiste Foureaux opened the Théâtre des Variétés. He was engaged to paint the curtain, and chose to depict the nine Muses. In 1840, on the occasion of a special visit by the troupe of Eugène Hette, he created a second curtain. The theater was demolished, following a fire, in 1869.

He died in 1858, aged fifty-four. His wife, who had converted to Orthodoxy and taken the name "Maria", died six years later. Some of his paintings have been declared "movable cultural assets" and are registered in the Patrimoniul Cultural Național.
