= Costache Caragiale =

Romanian actor and theatre manager

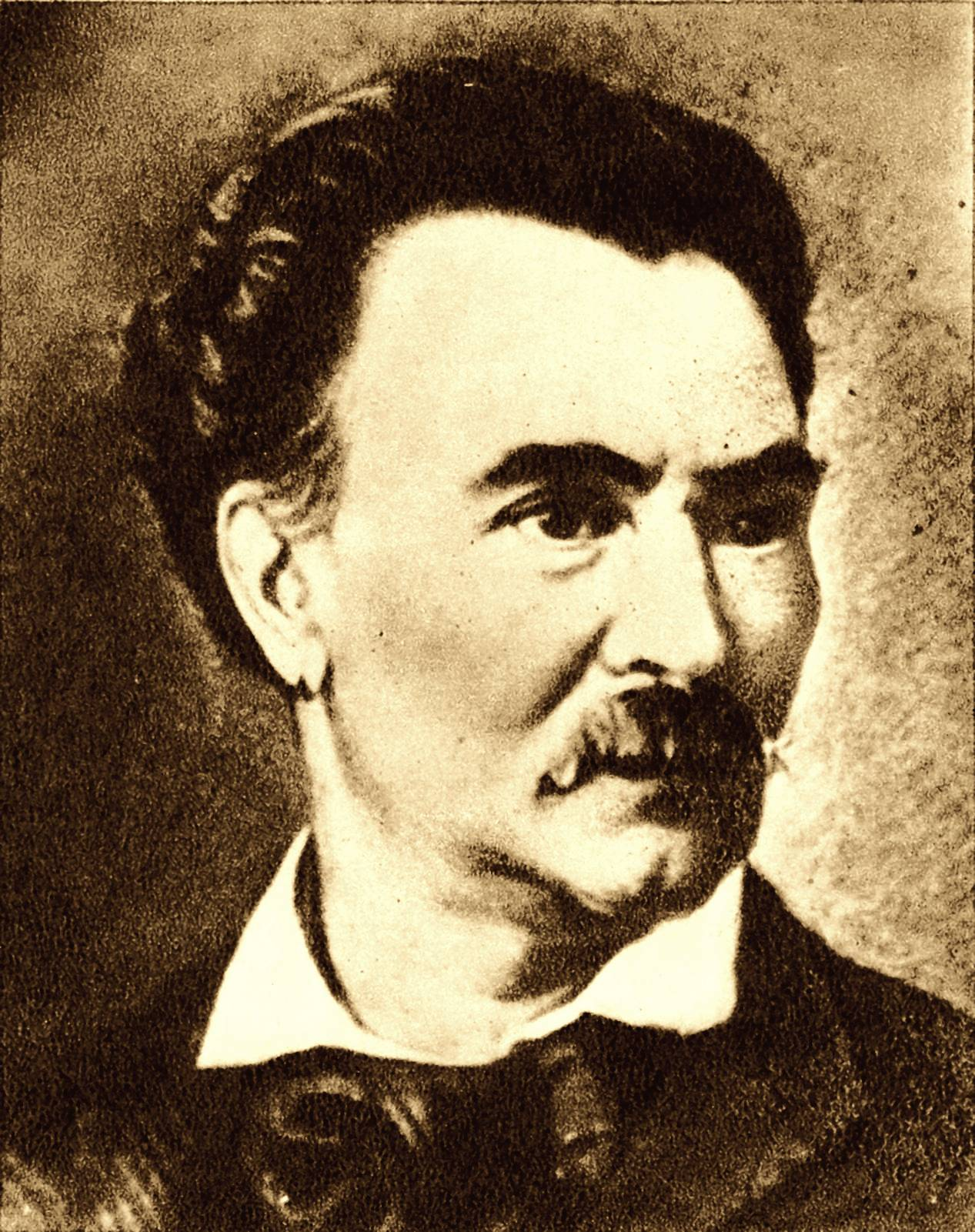
- Born: March 29, 1815; Bucharest, Wallachia
- Died: February 13, 1877 (aged 61)
- Occupations: actor, theatre manager
- Relatives: Iorgu Caragiale (brother); Ion Luca Caragiale (nephew)

Costache Caragiale (Romanian pronunciation: [kosˈtake karaˈdʒjale]; 29 March 1815 – 13 February 1877) was a Romanian actor and theatre manager who had an important role in the development of the Romanian theatre.

Born in Bucharest, Wallachia, he made his stage debut in 1835 and, in 1838, organized a theatre company in Iași, Moldavia, which became part of the first Romanian National Theatre.

He worked in many Romanian regional theatres, especially in Iași, Craiova, and Botoșani, and encouraged the usage of plays by Romanian dramatists of the day, especially those of Vasile Alecsandri and Constantin Negruzzi. Between 1852 and 1855, Costache Caragiale was the first director of the National Theatre Bucharest. He also wrote a few comedies, such as O repetiție moldovenească – A Moldavian Rehearsal (1844) and O soaré la mahala (A Soirée in the Neighbourhood) in 1847.

He is the uncle of Ion Luca Caragiale, a Romanian playwright. His younger brother, Iorgu Caragiale, was also an actor and theatre director.

== Works ==
- Scrieri a lui Costache Caragiale, ("Writings by Costache Caragiale"), 1840
- Epistolă către Grigore Alexandrescu, ("Letter to Grigore Alexandrescu"), 1841
- Leonil sau Ce produce disprețul, ("Leonil or What Contempt Produces"), 1841
- O repetiție moldovenească sau Noi și iar Noi, ("A Moldavian Rehearsal or We And We Again"), 1844, comedy
- O soaré la mahala sau Amestecul de dorinți, ("A Soirée in the Low-Life Neighborhood or The Mixture of Aspirations"), comedy
- Îngâmfata plăpumăreasă sau Cucoană sunt ("The Conceited Quiltmaker or A Lady I Am")
- Doi coțcari sau Feriți-vă de răi ca de foc ("Two Swindlers or Avoid the Bad Ones Like Poison")
- Învierea morților ("The Resurrection of the Dead")
- Urmarea coțcarilor ("The Swindlers, A Sequel")
- Prologul pentru inaugurarea noului teatru din București, ("Prologue at the Inauguration of the New Theater in Bucharest"), (1852), 1881
- Teatrul Național în Țara Românească, ("The National Theater in Wallachia"), (1855), 1867

=== Translations ===
- Furiosul, ("Orlando Furioso" ?), 1840
