= François-Joseph-Michel Noël =

French humanist and diplomat (1756–1841)

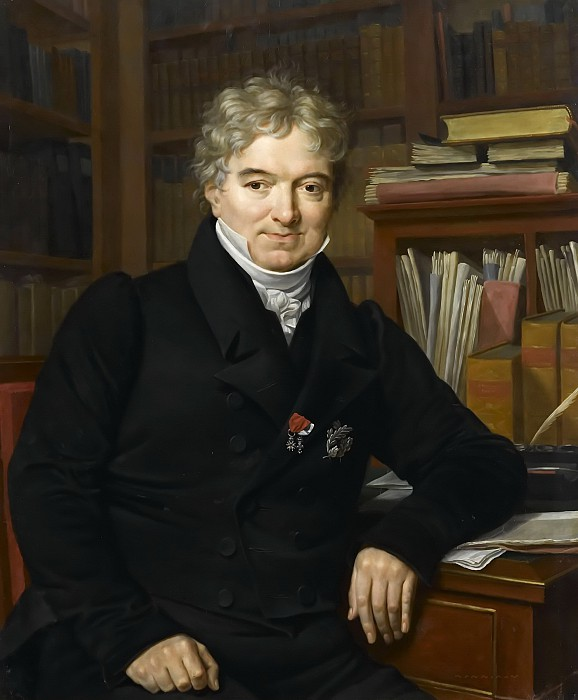
François-Joseph Noël (portrait by Constant Delaperche)

François-Joseph-Michel Noël (12 January 1756, Saint-Germain-en-Laye - 29 January 1841, Paris) was a French humanist and diplomat.

== Life ==
A student then a professor at the collège Louis-le-Grand, Noël left his job at the outbreak of the French Revolution, collaborating on the journal la Chronique and going on several diplomatic missions; in 1795/96 to the Batavian Republic.

Named a member of the Tribunat, he left it to go to Lyon to fill the role of commissar-general of police. In 1801, he was made préfet of the Haut-Rhin and, in 1802, inspector general of public education.

== Works ==
His very numerous works were in large part compilations of his views on university education.

Noël wrote, with, J.-M.-J. de La Place : Conciones poeticæ, ou Discours choisis des poètes latins anciens (Paris, 1803, in-12); Leçons françaises de littérature et de morale (1801., 2 vol. in-8°), a frequently-reprinted anthology long used in all collèges; Leçons latines anciennes (1808, 2 vol. in-8°); Leçons latines modernes (1818, 2 vol. in-8°); Leçons grecques (1825, 2 vol. in-8°).

With Charles-Pierre Chapsal, he prepared : Nouvelle grammaire française (Paris, 1823, 2 vol. in-12), which became a classic and remained in usage despite well-founded criticisms of it for imposing arbitrary and contradictory rules on the spirit of the French language and on good authors' usage of it; Nouveau dictionnaire de la langue française (1826; in-12).

Also by Noël, with various collaborators : Dictionnaire étymologique, critique, historique, anecdotique et littéraire... pour servir à l’histoire de la langue française, 1839, avec M. L.-J. Carpentier (Paris, Le Normant, 1839); le Nouveau siècle de Louis XIV (Paris, 1793, 1 vol. in-8), anthology of satirical chansons and verse on Louis XIV and his court; Éphémérides politiques, littéraires et religieuses (Paris, 1796–1797, 4. vol. in-8°); Dictionnaire de la Fable (Paris, 1801, 2 vol. in-8°); Dictionnarium Latino-gallicum (Paris, 1807, in-8°); Nouveau dictionnaire, français Latin (Paris, 1808, in-8°); Gradus ad Parnassum (Paris, 1810, in-8°); Philologie française ou Dictionnaire étymologique, critique, historique, etc. (Paris, 1831, 2 vol. in-8°); Nouveau dictionnaire des origines, inventions et découvertes (Paris, 1827, 2 vol. in-8°), etc.

Noël translated Catullus and Gallus (1803, 2 vol. in-8°), and (with Dureau de La Malle's son) completed the translation of Livy by Dureau de La Malle (1810–1824, 17 vol. in-8°). He also revised the translations of Virgil and Horace by Binet.

He also translated several English works into French, and edited various authors.

== Sources ==
- Gustave Vapereau, Dictionnaire universel des littératures, Paris, Hachette, 1876, p. 1498
