= Holy Forty Martyrs Church, Iași =

Romanian Orthodox church in Iași, Romania

Coordinates: 47°10′26″N 27°34′32″E

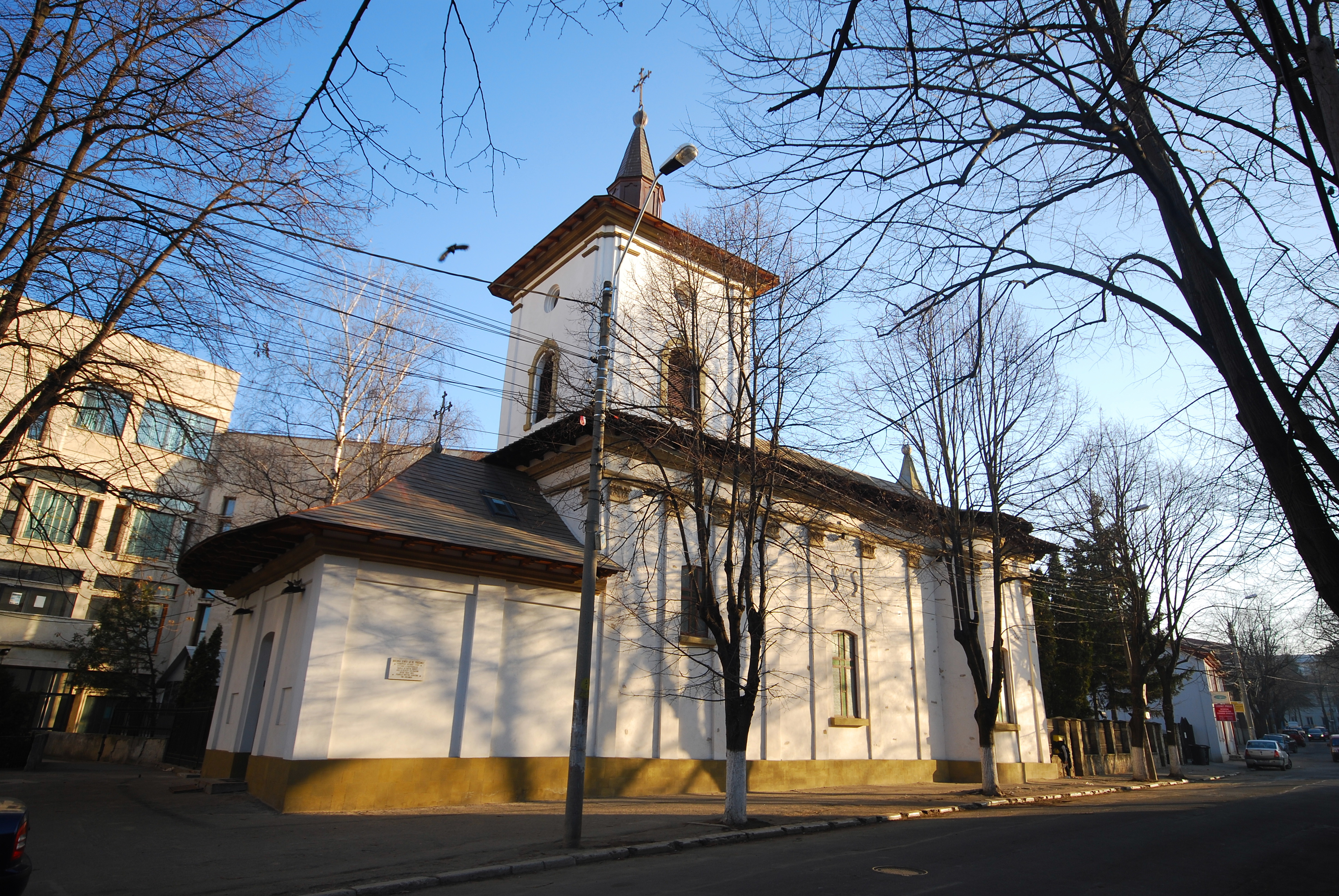
Holy Forty Martyrs Church

The Holy Forty Martyrs Church (Romanian: Biserica Sfinții 40 de Mucenici) is a Romanian Orthodox church located at 12 General Henri M. Berthelot Street in Iași, Romania. It is dedicated to the Forty Martyrs of Sebaste.

Located in the Copou neighborhood, which in the mid-18th century was sparsely populated and had no place of worship, the church was built in 1760 by hetman Vasile Roset and his wife Safta. It was located on a plot of land granted that year by Prince Ioan Teodor Callimachi. Completed quickly, it was blessed by the prince's brother, Metropolitan Gavriil Callimachi. Initially, Roset placed the church under the protection of the Ecumenical Patriarchate of Constantinople. In 1767, he transferred it to the Metropolis of Proilavia. Within twenty years, the church was in a state of degradation, prompting the high vistiernic Lascarache Roset to try and reclaim the church founded by his parents. Thus, he obtained a decree in 1787 from Prince Alexander Ypsilantis, providing twenty lei per month in customs revenue for church maintenance. Successive princes issued orders maintaining or increasing the allowance: Constantine Ypsilantis (1799), Alexandros Soutzos (1801), Alexander Mourousis (1803), Michael Soutzos (1820). Aside from the princes' and donors' contributions, the church earned revenue by renting out parcels of land in its yard or on its other properties, with the tenants required to pay an annual fee. Deceased parishioners were buried in the churchyard until 1871, when the city hall ordered a halt to church burials, their function supplanted by the new Eternitatea cemetery. Gheorghe Asachi was buried outside the church in 1869; a dozen members of his family share the grave.

A vestibule with a choir space above was added in 1868, as well as a bell tower. The large bell, which weighs some 300 kg, dates to 1892. A foyer was installed in 1924. The church is in the Constantinople Baroque style, with its 24 stone pilasters with neo-Corinthian capitals of stone, as well as the two massive interior columns that separate nave from vestibule. The exterior division into decorative panels as well as certain ornamental details are Neoclassical; these elements appeared in the 1780s and '90s, making it the first church in Iași to feature a style that would become dominant in early 19th-century Moldavia. The church collection includes valuable icons, rare books, silver items and an archive. The iconostasis, of stuccoed linden coated in gold leaf, is original to 1760. Sculpted in Balkan Baroque, it features four 1814 icons (Christ, Virgin Mary, the Forty Martyrs and Saint Nicolas) painted and signed by Eustație Altini.

Cultural figures associated with the parish include Altini, Asachi, Veniamin Costache, Alexandru Hrisoverghi, Spiru Haret and Ion Creangă, who was deacon there from 1859 to 1863. A memorial to Creangă was set up on the centennial of his death in 1989, while the yard features marble busts of him and Asachi. In 1890, Asachi was reburied beneath his statue. The nearby headstone marks the grave of Altini and Hrisoverghi.

The church is listed as a historic monument by Romania's Ministry of Culture and Religious Affairs.

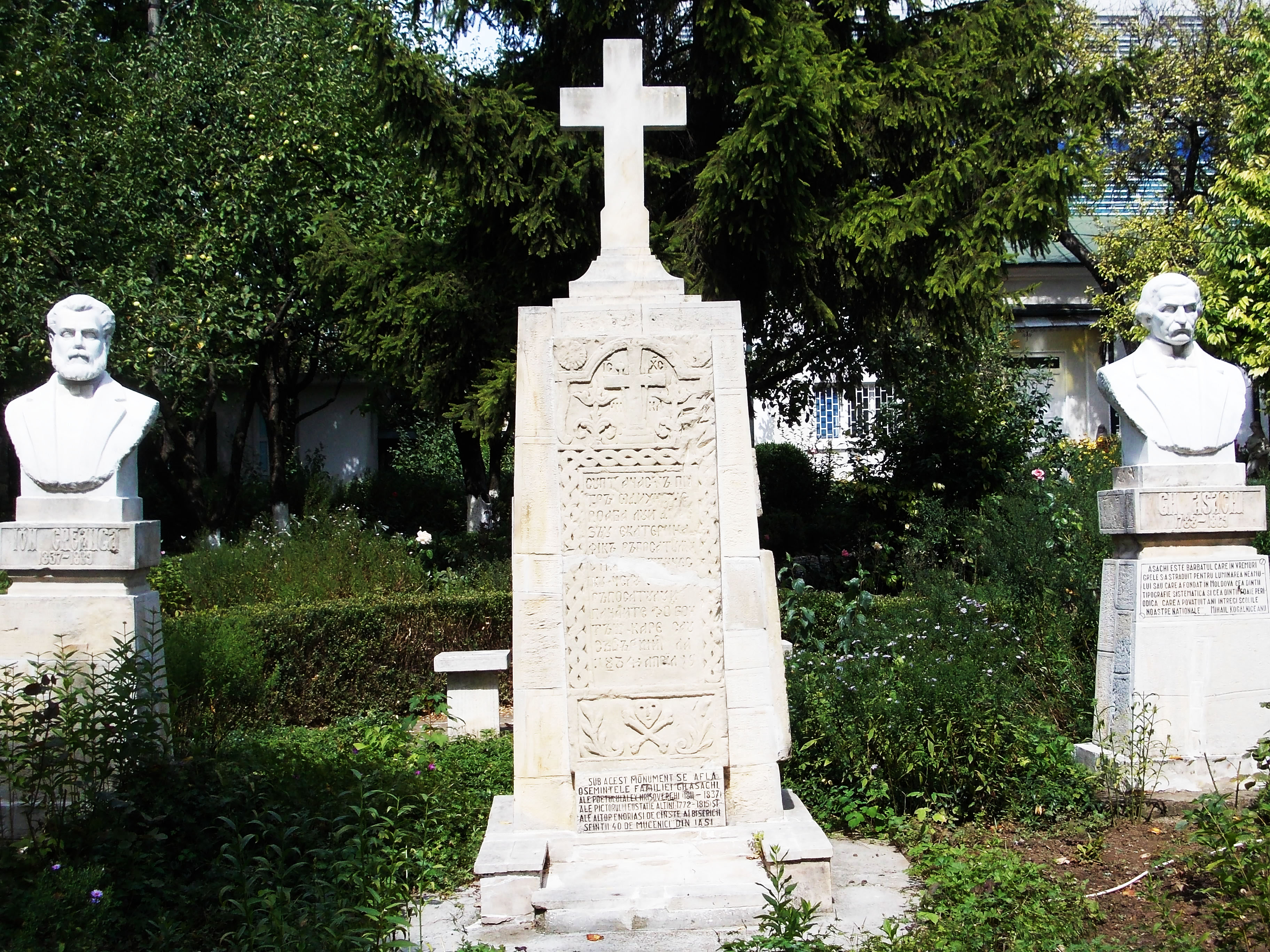
Creangă and Asachi

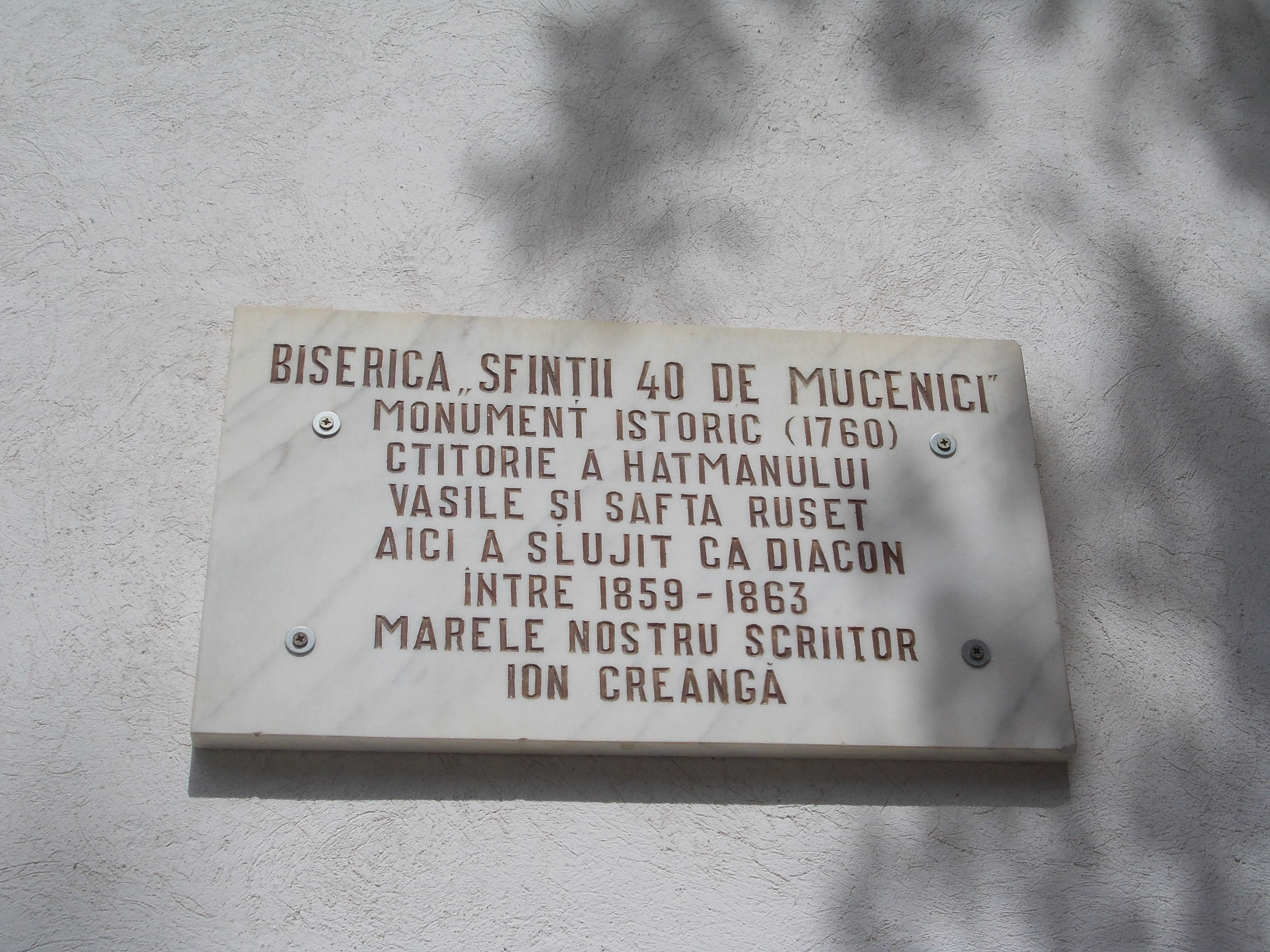
Creangă plaque
