= Zuccaro =

Zuccaro is an Italian surname. Notable people with the name include:

- Antonio Zuccaro (1815–1892), Italian painter
- Edward Zuccaro (1943–2025), American politician from Vermont
- Federico Zuccari (c. 1540-1609), Italian painter
- Ignazio Zuccaro (1839–1913), Italian Roman Catholic priest and bishop
- Joseph Stephen Zuccaro Jr. (c. 1924–2008), justice of the Supreme Court of Mississippi
- Taddeo Zuccaro (1529-1566), Italian painter

== See also ==
- Zuccari (surname)
