= Hermiona Asachi =

Romanian writer and translator (1821–1900)

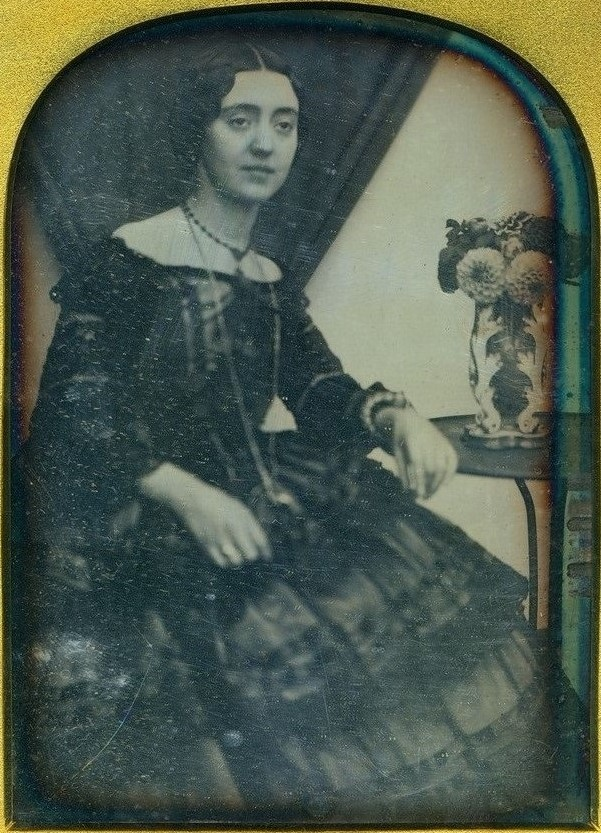
- Born: December 16, 1821; Iași, Moldavia
- Died: December 9, 1900 (aged 78); Paris, France
- Occupations: Author, translator, writer
- Spouses: Alexandru Moruzi (div. 1849); Edgar Quinet (m. 1852; died 1875)

Hermiona (Note: Also spelled Hermione and Ermiona.) Asachi (Romanian: [aˈsaki], surname also spelled Asaki; December 16, 1821 – December 9, 1900), also known as Hermione Asachi, was a Romanian writer and translator.

== Life ==
Hermiona was born Glicheria Melirato, the daughter of Kiriaco Melirato and Elena Teyber. She was later adopted by Gheorghe Asachi, her mother's second husband.

Hermiona translated texts by Silvio Pellico and Benjamin Franklin into Romanian for her father's publication Albina Românească. In 1845, she moved to France, where she corresponded with various French intellectuals such as Victor Hugo, Jules Michelet and Louis Blanc.

She was first married to Alexandru D. Moruzi. In 1852, she married the French historian Edgar Quinet, She edited some of Quinet's texts for publication, subsequently publishing under the name Hermiona Quinet.

Asachi died in Paris at the age of 78.

== Works ==
=== Literary translations ===
- René-Paul și Paul-René, translation of the short story by Émile Deschamps (1839)
- Ruth, poems by Caroline Pichler (1839)
- Istoria sfântă pentru tinerimea moldo-română (Sacred history for young Moldavians and Romanians) (1840)
- Despre îndatoririle oamenilor (On the duties of men), by Silvio Pellico (1843)

=== Edgar Quinet ===
Works published from Edgar Quinet's notes, manuscripts, and notebooks. Many were selected, annotated, prefaced, and arranged by Hermione.

- Mémoires d'exil (1869)
- Paris, journal du siège (1873)
- Sentiers de France (1875)
- Le livre de l'exilé, 1851-1870; Après l'exil, manifestes et discours, 1871-1875 (1875)
- Vie et mort du génie grec (1876)
- Lettres à sa mère (1877)
- Histoire de mes idées (1878)
- Lettres d'exil à Michelet et à divers amis (1885-6) (4 volumes)
- Edgar Quinet avant et depuis l'exil (1887-9)
- Cinquante ans d'amitié, Michelet-Quinet (1899)

=== Other works ===
- Le Vrai dans l'éducation (1891)
- Ce que dit la musique (1893)
- La France idéale (1896)
- De Paris à Édimbourg (1898)
