= Zuccari =

Zuccari may refer to:

- Zuccari (surname), Italian surname
- Palazzo Zuccari, Florence;
- Palazzo Zuccari, Rome

== See also ==
- Zuccaro
