= Edgar Quinet =

French writer, historian and politician (1803–1875)

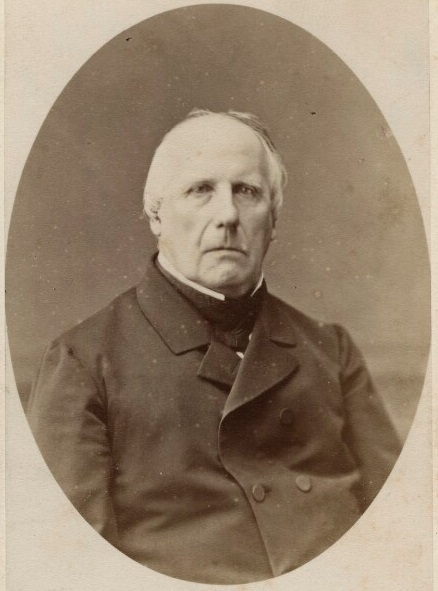
Edgar Quinet photographed in 1860

Edgar Jean Louis Quinet (French: [ɛdɡaʁ kinɛ]; 17 February 1803 – 27 March 1875) was a French writer, historian and politician.

== Biography ==
=== Early years ===
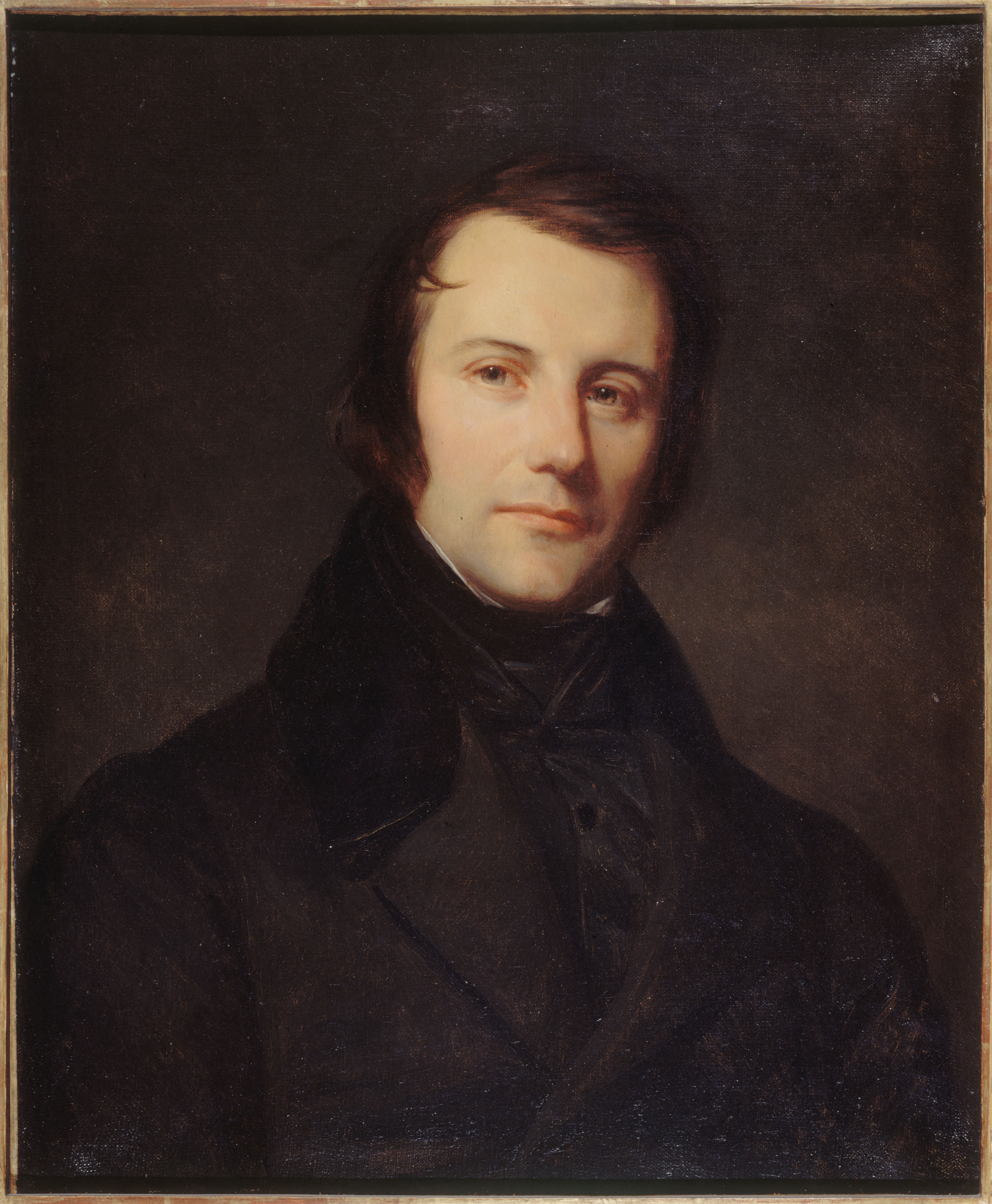
Portrait by Sébastien-Melchior Cornu, c. 1835

Quinet was born at Bourg-en-Bresse, in the département of Ain. His father, Jérôme Quinet, had been a commissary in the army, but being a strong republican and disgusted with Napoleon's 18 Brumaire coup, he gave up his post and devoted himself to scientific and mathematical study. Edgar, who was an only child, was usually alone, but his mother (Eugénie Rozat Lagis, who was an educated person with strong, albeit original, Protestant religious views) exercised great influence over him.

He was sent to school, first in Bourg and then in Lyon. His father wished him on leaving school to go into the army, and then enter a business career. Quinet was determined to engage in literature, and after a time got his way when he moved to Paris in 1820.

His first publication, Les tablettes du juif errant ("The Tablets of the Wandering Jew"), which appeared in 1823, symbolized the progress of humanity. He became impressed with German intellectual writing and undertook the translation of Johann Gottfried Herder's Ideen zur Philosophie der Geschichte der Menschheit ("Outlines of Philosophy of the History of Man"). He learnt German for the purpose, published his work in 1827, and obtained through it considerable credit.

=== Early writings ===
At this time he was introduced to Victor Cousin, and made the acquaintance of Jules Michelet. He had visited Germany and the United Kingdom before the appearance of his book. Cousin obtained for him a position on a government mission in Greece, the "Scientific Expedition of Morea", in 1829 (at the end of the Greek War of Independence against the Ottoman Empire), and on his return he published in 1830 a book on La Grèce moderne ("Modern Greece"). With Michelet he published a volume of works in 1843, denouncing Jesuits and blaming them for religious, political and social troubles. He also became acquainted with and a lover of the works of Ralph Waldo Emerson in 1838. Quinet wrote several lectures praising Emerson's works which were published with the title of Le Christianisme et la Revolution Francaise in 1845.

Hopes of employment that he had after the July Revolution were frustrated by his reputation as a speculative republican. Nonetheless, he joined the staff of the Revue des deux mondes, and for some years contributed numerous essays, the most remarkable of which was that on Les Épopées françaises du XIIème siècle, an early, although not the earliest, appreciation of the long-neglected chansons de geste. Ahasverus, his first major original work, appeared in 1833—it is a singular prose poem.

Shortly afterwards he married Minna More, a German girl with whom he had fallen in love some years before. Growing disillusioned with German thought because of Prussian aggressive tactics, he visited Italy, and, besides writing many essays, produced two poems, Napoléon (1835) and Prométhée (1838), both written in verse and seen as inferior to Ahasverus published in 1833. In 1838 he published a strong reply to David Strauss' Leben Jesu, and in that year he received the Legion of Honour. In 1839 he was appointed professor of foreign literature at Lyon, where he began the highly influential course of lectures which formed the basis for his Génie des religions. Two years later he was transferred to the Collège de France, and the Génie des religions, published (1842), he sympathized with all religions but did not favor one above all.

=== Professorship ===
Quinet's Parisian professorship, which began in 1842, was notorious as the subject of polemics. His chair was that of Southern Literature, but, neglecting his proper subject, he chose, in conjunction with Michelet, to engage in a violent polemic with the Jesuits and with Ultramontanism. Two books bearing exactly these titles appeared in 1843 and 1844, and contained, as was usual with Quinet, the substance of his lectures.

These lectures excited great debate and the author obstinately refused to return to literature strictly construed; consequently, in 1846, the government put an end to the lectures, a measure that was arguably approved by the majority of his colleagues. He was dismissed in 1846 by the Collège de France for his adamant attacks on the Roman Catholic Church, exaltation of the revolution, support for the oppressed nationalities of France and for supporting the theory that religion is a determining force in societies.

=== 1848 Revolution ===
By this time Quinet was a pronounced republican, and something of a revolutionary. He joined the rioters during the 1848 Revolution which overthrew King Louis-Philippe of France, and was elected by the département of Ain to the Constituent and then to the Legislative Assembly, where he affiliated with the extreme radical party.

He had published in 1848 Les Révolutions d'Italie ("The Revolutions of Italy"), one of his main works. He wrote numerous pamphlets during the short-lived Second French Republic, attacked the Roman expedition with all his strength and was from the first an uncompromising opponent of Prince Louis-Napoléon Bonaparte (Napoleon III).

=== Exile ===
Quinet fled Louis Napoléon's 1851 coup d'état to Brussels until 1858 and then fled to Veytaux, Switzerland, until 1870. His wife had died some time previously, and he now married Hermiona Asachi (or Asaky), the daughter of Gheorghe Asachi, a Romanian poet. In Brussels, Quinet lived for some seven years, during which he published Les Esclaves ("The Slaves", 1853), a dramatic poem, Marnix de Sainte-Aldégonde (1854), a study of the Reformer in which he emphasizes Sainte-Aldégonde's literary merit, and some other books.

In Veytaux, his literary output was greater than ever. In 1860, he published a unique volume, partly reflecting the style of Ahasverus, and entitled Merlin l'enchanteur (Merlin the Enchanter); in 1862, a Histoire de la campagne de 1815 ("History of the Campaign of 1815"), in 1865 an elaborate book on the French Revolution, in which the author depicts atrocities carried out by revolutionary forces (causing his rejection by many other partisans of republican ideas). Many pamphlets date from this period, as does La Création (1870), a third book of the genre of Ahasverus and Merlin, but even vaguer – dealing with physical science rather than history, legend, or philosophy for the most part.

=== Return and final years ===
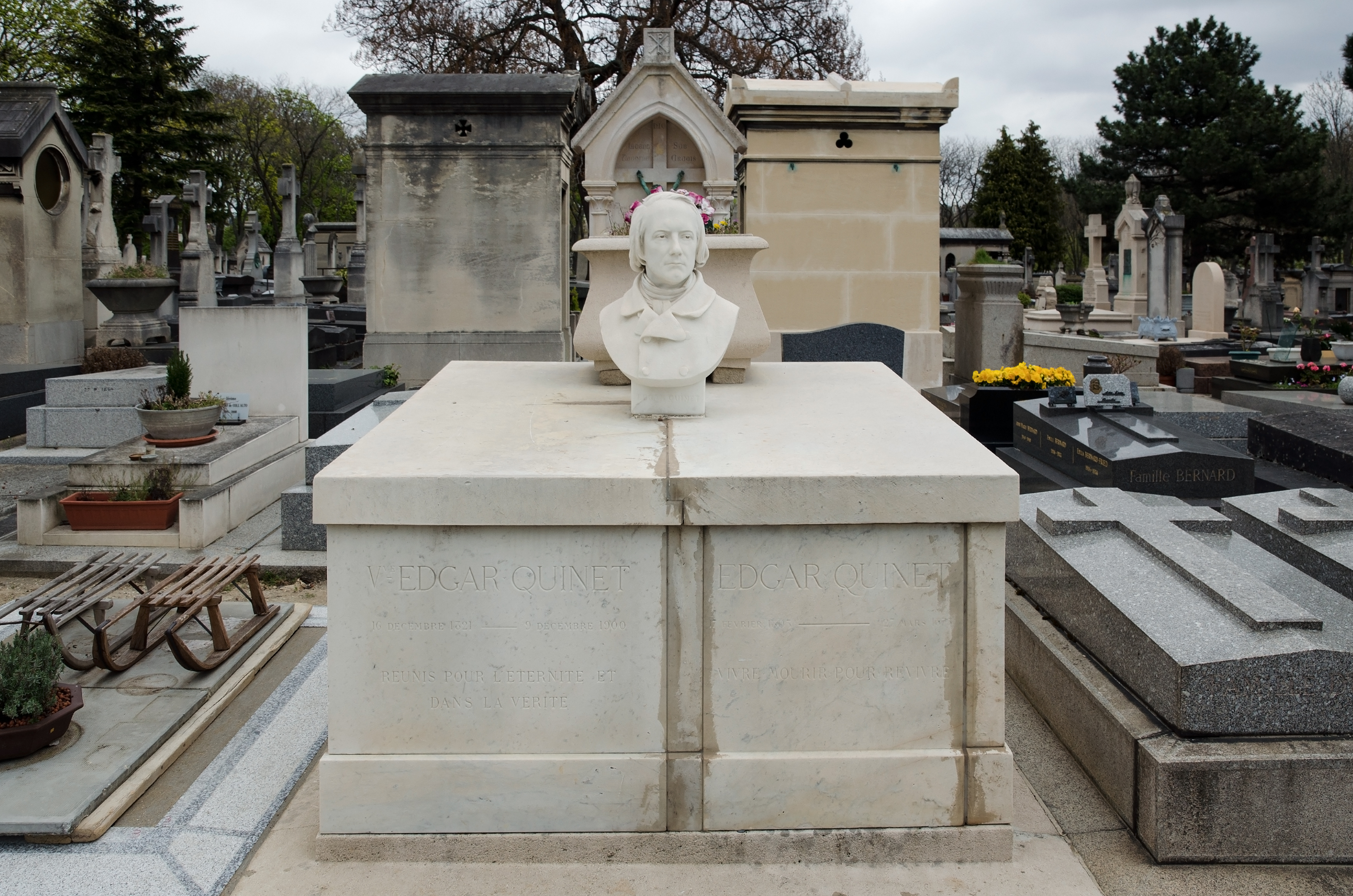
Grave of Quinet in Montparnasse cemetery, Paris

Quinet had refused to return to France to join the liberal opposition against Napoleon III, but returned immediately after the Battle of Sedan in the Franco-Prussian War. He was then restored to his professorship, and during the siege of Paris wrote vehemently against the Germans. He was elected deputy to the National Assembly by the département of the Seine in 1871, and was one of the most obstinate opponents of the terms of peace between France and Germany. He continued to write till his death, which occurred at Versailles in 1875.

Le Siège de Paris et la défense nationale ("The Siege of Paris and the National Defence") appeared in 1871, La République ("The Republic") in 1872, Le Livre de l'exilé ("The Book of Exile") in the year of its author's death and after it. This was followed by three volumes of letters and some other work. Quinet had already in 1858 published a semi-autobiographical book called Histoire de mes idées ("History of My Ideas").

== Personality ==
According to the Encyclopædia Britannica Eleventh Edition:

His character was extremely amiable, and his letters to his mother, his accounts of his early life, and so forth, are likely always to make him interesting. He was also a man of great moral conscientiousness, and as far as intention went perfectly disinterested. As a writer, his chief fault is want of concentration; as a thinker and politician, vagueness and want of practical determination. His historical and philosophical works, though showing much reading, fertile thought, abundant facility of expression, and occasionally, where prejudice does not come in, acute judgment, are rather (as not a few of them were in fact) reported lectures than formal treatises. His rhetorical power was altogether superior to his logical power, and the natural consequence is that his work is full of contradictions. These contradictions were, moreover, due, not merely to an incapacity or an unwillingness to argue strictly, but also to the presence in his mind of a large number of inconsistent tastes and prejudices which he either could not or would not co-ordinate into an intelligible creed. Thus he has the strongest attraction for the picturesque side of medievalism and catholicity, the strongest repulsion for the restrictions which medieval and Catholic institutions imposed on individual liberty. He refused to submit himself to any form of positive orthodoxy, yet when a man like Strauss pushed unorthodoxy to its extreme limits Quinet revolted. As a politician he acted with the extreme radicals, yet universal suffrage disgusted him as unreasonable in its principle and dangerous in its results. His pervading characteristic, therefore, is that of an eloquent vagueness, very stimulating and touching at times, but as deficient in coercive force of matter as it is in lasting precision and elegance of form. He is less inaccurate in fact than Michelet, but he is also much less absorbed by a single idea at a time, and the result is that he seldom attains to the vivid representation of which Michelet was a master.

== Early editions ==
His numerous works appeared in a uniform edition of twenty-eight volumes (1877–79). His second wife, in 1870, published certain Mémoires d'exil, and Lettres d'exil followed in 1885. In that year Prof. George Saintsbury published a selection of the Lettres à ma mère (Letters to My Mother) with an introduction.

== English translations published in the United States ==
- Ahashuerus translated by Brian Stableford, 2013, Black Coat Press, ISBN 978-1612272146
