= Natale Schiavoni =

Italian painter (1777–1858)

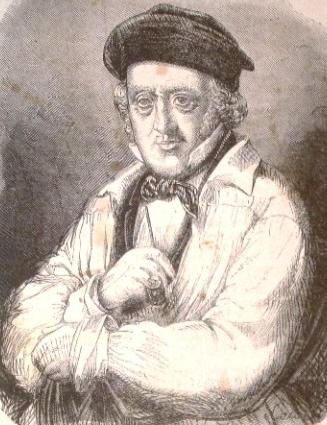
Engraved portrait of Natale Schiavoni from Natale e Felice Schiavoni, vita, opere, tempi (1881)

Natale Schiavoni (25 April 1777 – 15 April 1858) was an Italian painter and engraver, specializing in history and portraits. Many of his paintings depict seductive nubile women.

== Biography ==
Schiavoni was born in Chioggia, near Venice, and was claimed by Frederick Mason Perkins to be a distant descendant of Andrea Schiavone, the Renaissance painter. In Venice, he trained with Francesco Maggiotto and later came under the influence of the Neoclassicism.

He was peripatetic, traveling in 1800 to Trieste, and in 1810 to Milan, where he painted Eugène de Beauharnais and the royal family. In Milan, he was able to frequent the studios of Appiani, Longhi, and Sabatelli. In 1816, Schiavoni was invited by the Austrian emperor to Vienna, to become the official portraitist for the court. From there, he returned to Venice in 1821, where he became professor at the Academy of Fine Arts. He resided in the Palazzo Giustinian on the Grand Canal. He died there in 1858.

Among his works are a Penitent Magdalene (1852), in the National Gallery of Berlin; a painting on the same subject at the Vienna Museum; a Bacchante, at the Stadel Gallery in Frankfort; and an Adoration of Shepherds, displayed at the British Museum, London. He was awarded a gold medal at an exhibition in Brussels.

The art historian, Pietro Selvatico, later described his works as in coloring, highly skillful, but in shading, inimitably supreme.

His sons Felice (1803–68) and Giovanni (1804–48) were also painters of mythology and history. Among his followers was Antonio Zuccaro (1815–1892). Many of his paintings were engraved by Luigi Boscolo.

== Gallery ==
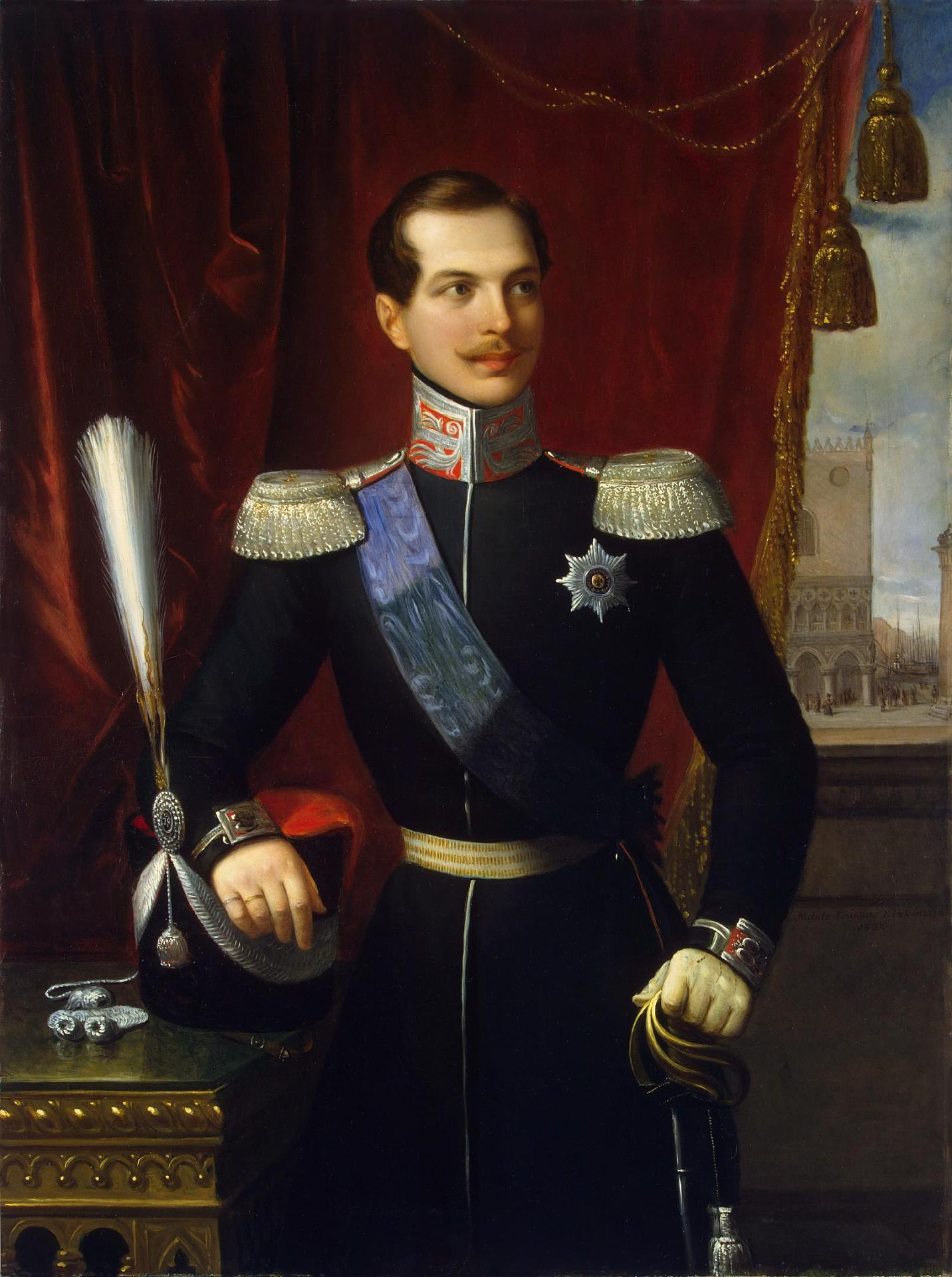
Grand Duke Alexander Nikolaevich, 1838

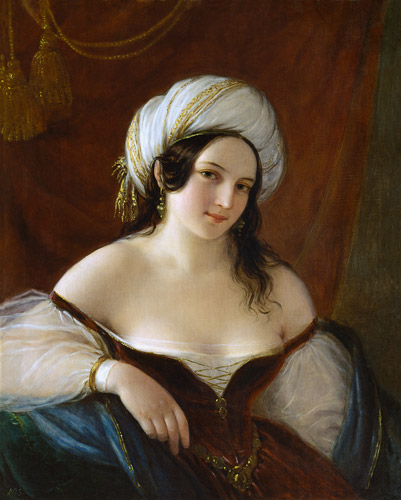
Odalisque, 1845, Museo Revoltella, Trieste.

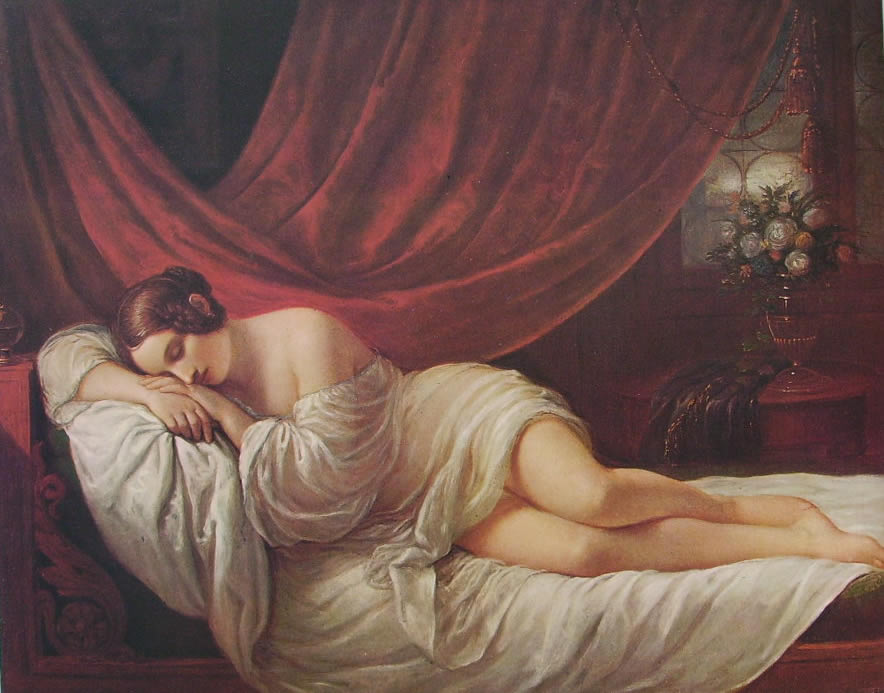
Dream of a Sixteen Year old, circa 1820.

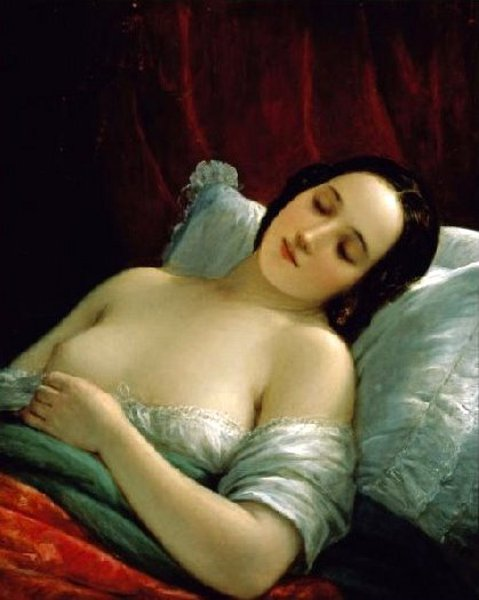
The Sleeper, circa 1820.

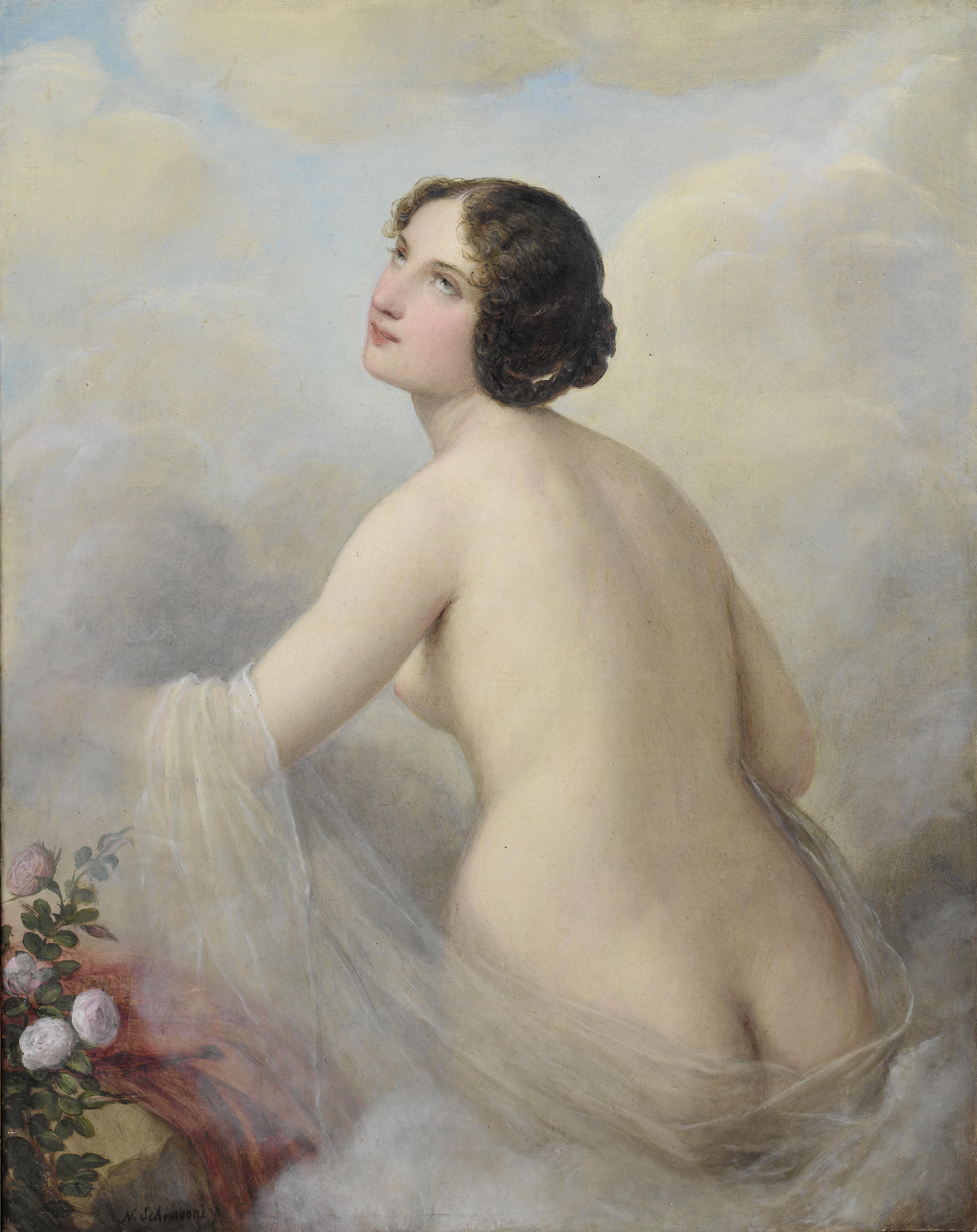
Venus

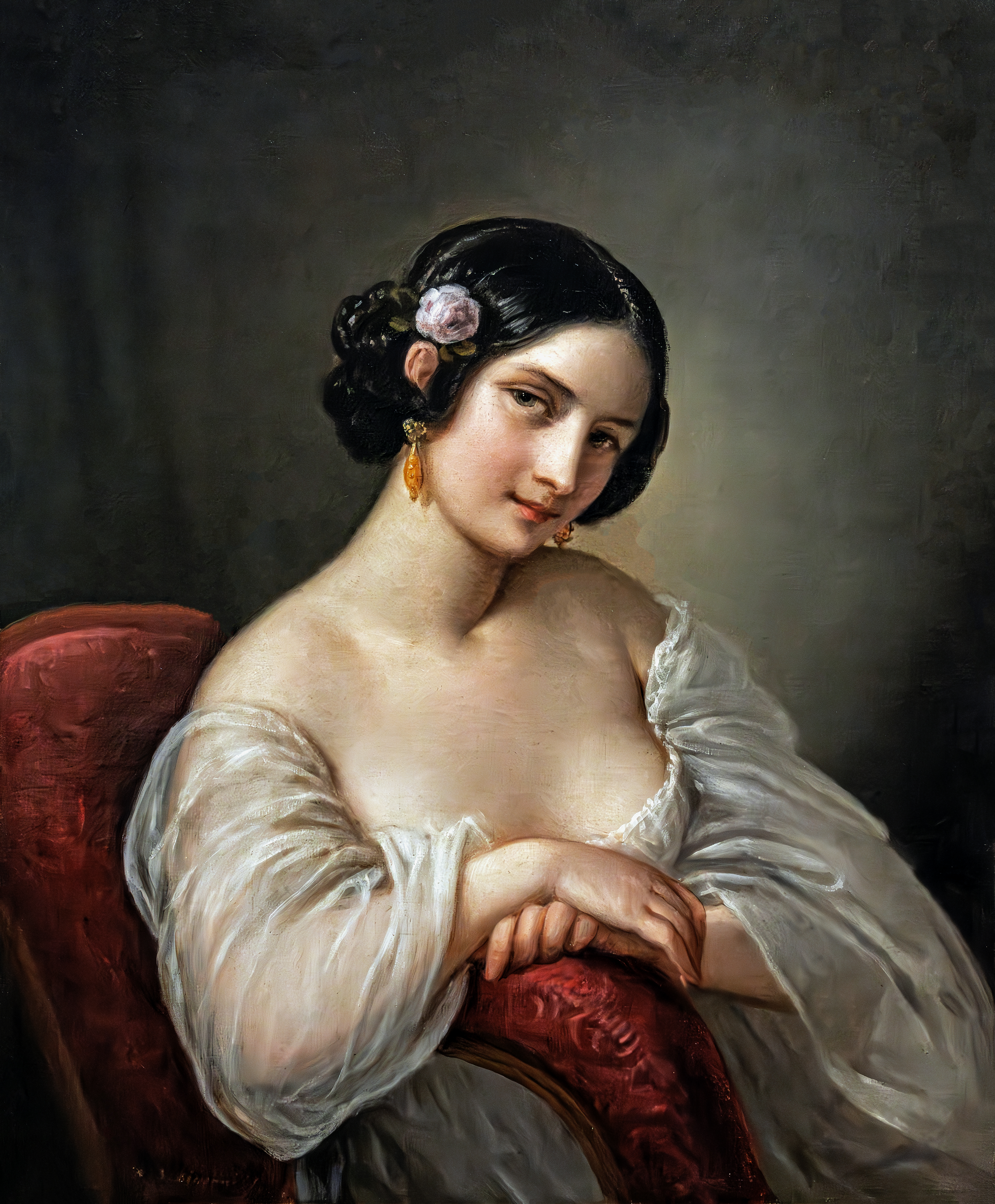
Flora , Museo civico Luigi Bailo Treviso
