= Giovanni Schiavoni =

Italian painter and art professor

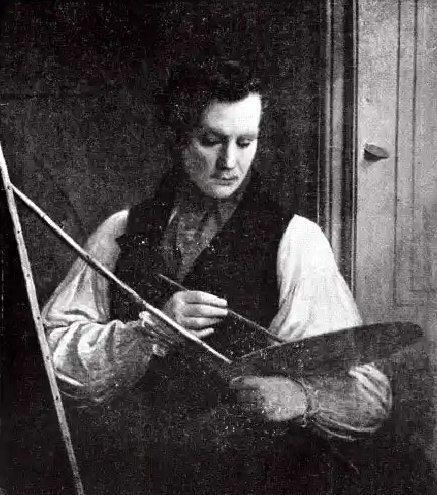
Giovanni Schiavoni; portrait by his father, Natale

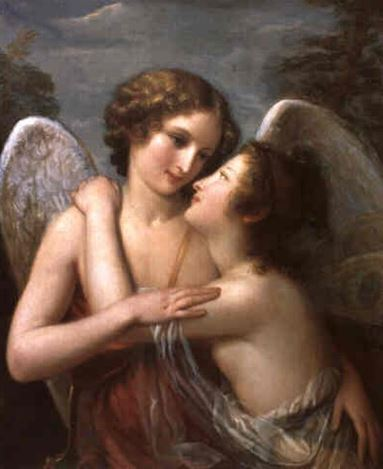
Amor and Psyche

Giovanni Schiavoni (July 1804, Trieste - 7 September 1848, Venice) was an Italian painter and art professor, who worked in Austria and Moldavia.

== Biography ==
His father, Natale Schiavoni, was a portrait painter and engraver. His older brother, Felice, also became a painter. Both received their first lessons from their father. Giovanni later attended the Academy of Fine Arts Vienna. He remained there after graduating and became a portrait painter.

In 1837 he went to Iași, where Gheorghe Asachi, academic advisor to Prince Mihail Sturdza, had recruited him for a professorship at the recently established Academia Mihăileană. He only served for a short time, however; resigning in 1838 to travel in Russia.

He was called back to his professorship in 1841, by Prince Sturdza, in answer to a complaint that the teaching there had declined, and the students were producing little or nothing. Once again, his tenure was short, as the painting classes were disbanded in 1843 and he was dismissed without being paid. Shortly after, he was offered 1,000 Lei to collect antique busts and casts for the new " Eforia Școalelor" (a public school).

In 1844, he returned to Italy and died of a fever, contracted while fighting at Fort Marghera, during the Revolution of 1848.
