= Gheorghe Asachi =

Moldavian polymath (1788–1869)

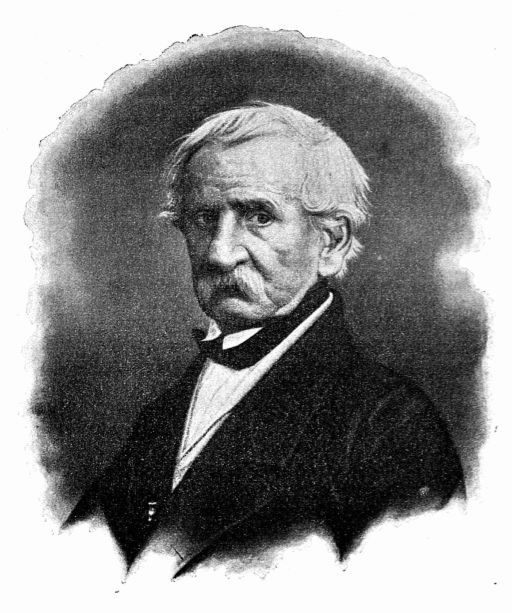
- Born: 1 March 1788; Herța, Principality of Moldavia
- Died: 12 November 1869 (aged 81); Iași, Principality of Romania
- Occupations: poet, short story writer, dramatist, essayist, journalist, translator, painter, engineer, architect, schoolteacher, academic, civil servant
- Writing career
- Period: c. 1812 – c. 1860
- Genres: lyric poetry, epic poetry, novella
- Subjects: history of Romania, Romanian mythology
- Movements: Romanticism; Classicism

Gheorghe Asachi (Romanian pronunciation: [ˈɡe̯orɡe aˈsaki], surname also spelled Asaki; 1 March 1788 – 12 November 1869) was a Romanian prose writer, poet, painter, historian, dramatist, engineer, border maker, and translator. An Enlightenment-educated polymath and polyglot, he was one of the most influential people of his generation. Asachi was a respected journalist and political figure, as well as active in technical fields such as civil engineering and pedagogy, and, for long, the civil servant charged with overseeing all Moldavian schools. Among his leading achievements were the issuing of Albina Românească, a highly influential magazine, and the creation of Academia Mihăileană, which replaced Greek-language education with teaching in Romanian. His literary works combined a taste for Classicism with Romantic tenets, while his version of the literary language relied on archaisms and borrowings from the Moldavian dialect.

A controversial political figure, Asachi endorsed the Imperial Russian presence in Moldavia and played a major part in establishing the Regulamentul Organic regime, while supporting the rule of Prince Mihail Sturdza. He thus came to clash with representatives of the liberal current, and opposed both the Moldavian revolution of 1848 and the country's union with Wallachia. Engaged in a long polemic with the liberal leader Mihail Kogălniceanu, he was, together with Nicolae Vogoride, involved in the unsuccessful attempt to block the unionist project through the means of an electoral fraud. Asachi was noted for his deep connections with Western culture, which led him to support the employment of foreign experts in various fields and educational institutions. He cultivated a relationship with the French historian Edgar Quinet, whose father-in-law he became in 1852.

== Biography ==
=== Early life ===
Asachi was born in Herța, a small town which is now part of Ukraine. His family originated in Austrian-ruled Transylvania, where it was known under the name Asachievici. His father, Lazăr, was an Orthodox priest who kept close contacts with Metropolitan Veniamin Costachi; according to several sources, he was of Armenian descent. His mother Elena (née Niculau or Ardeleanu) was herself the daughter of a Transylvanian priest. The couple had another son, named Petru. Lazăr Asachi was his son's first educator, after which the young Gheorghe most likely enrolled in the Church-run primary school in Herța.

In summer 1795, after deciding not to send Gheorghe and Petru to a Moldavian Greek-language school in the capital city of Iași, Lazăr Asachi opted to give them a more modern education in the Austrian lands, sending them to Lemberg, where they attended gymnasium. After completing seven terms of education in Latin, Polish and German, Gheorghe Asachi entered university (the present-day Lviv University) at the age of 14. He studied at the Faculty of Letters, Philosophy and Sciences (attending lectures in logic, metaphysics, ethics, mathematics, physics, natural history, and architecture), but, in 1804, after two years of studies, he withdrew and returned to Moldavia. Despite this, his level of familiarity with Western culture was arguably unparalleled in his native country during the first half of the 19th century. Over the following decades, he designed several lodgings in both his native country and Galicia.

His return followed the death of his mother and Lazăr Asachi's appointment as First Protopope of the Moldavian Metropolitan Seat, and saw the family settling in Iași.

=== In Napoleonic Europe ===
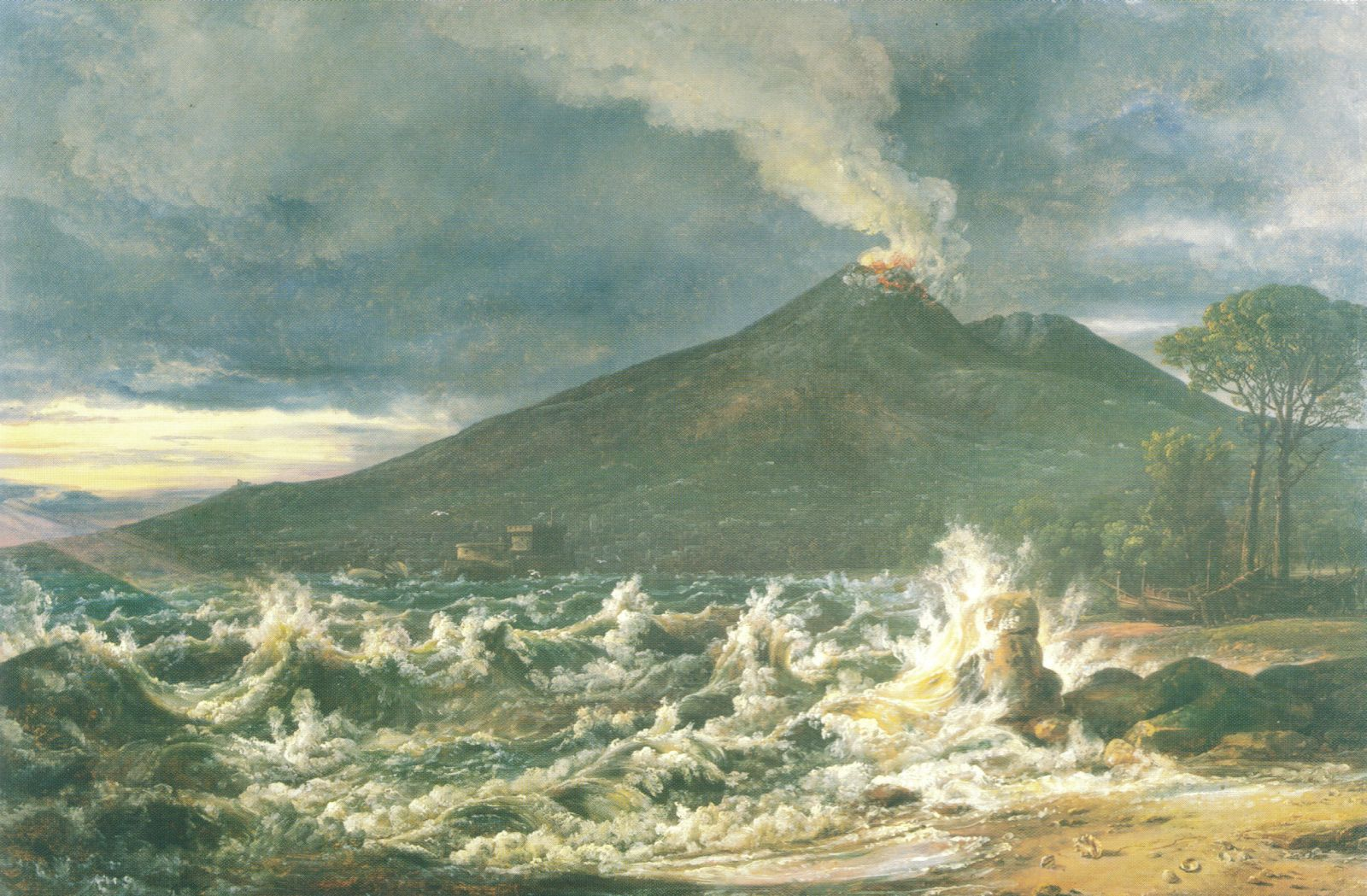
Mount Vesuvius seen from Castellammare di Stabia, 1821 painting by Johan Christian Dahl

In early 1805, Asachi fell ill with malaria, and was helped by Metropolitan Veniamin to travel to Vienna, where doctors had advised him to seek treatment. As the recipient of a state scholarship, Asachi studied mathematics and astronomy with Tobie Bürg, as well as pursuing training in the art of painting.

His time in the city coincided with the French Empire's successes in the Napoleonic Wars, and, most important, with the 1805 War of the Third Coalition, during which La Grande Armée occupied Vienna. This allowed Asachi to familiarize himself with French Revolutionary and liberal tenets, which he partly adopted in his political activities. In 1808, as the Russo-Turkish War erupted, Moldavia was occupied by the Russian Empire, First Protopope Lazăr contacted Pavel Chichagov to have his son appointed lieutenant and local head of the Corps of Engineers, but Gheorghe Asachi refused to assume office or even return from Vienna. Instead, he left for Italy in April 1808, aiming to complete his studies in Rome, but making long stops in other localities on the way (he notably visited Trieste, Venice, Padua, Ferrara, Bologna, and Florence). Reaching the capital of the Papal States on 11 June, Asachi left on 19 August to visit Naples, Pompeii, and other locations in the Kingdom of Sicily. Upon reaching Mount Vesuvius, he descended unaccompanied into the volcanic crater, and was encouraged by a cheering audience.

He soon after returned to Rome, where he focused on studying Renaissance Latin and Italian literature, as well as taking classes in archeology, painting and sculpture, and entered his most prolific phase in visual arts. In 1809, while visiting an art shop near the Spanish Steps, he met Bianca Milesi, the 19-year-old daughter of a wealthy merchant from Milan, with whom he fell in love. Despite her 1825 marriage to a French doctor, he was to remain her passionate admirer until her death from cholera in 1849. He later stressed that she had been a major source of inspiration for him, especially in allowing him the transition "from painter to poet", while the literary critic Eugen Lovinescu believed she inspired Asachi's Romantic nationalism.

At the time, he authored his first poems on Romanian nationalist subjects, which earned him an award presented by the Roman Literary Society. One of these was Viitorul ("The Future"), which voiced a call for national regeneration. Interested in the origin of the Romanians and the history of Roman Dacia, Asachi studied events depicted on Trajan's Column and searched the Vatican Library for documents regarding the history of Romania. It was during the latter research that he came across Dimitrie Cantemir's History of the Growth and Decay of the Ottoman Empire in its English-language edition.

Through Bianca Milesi, Asachi met François Miollis, the French commander in Rome, who reportedly told him that Napoleon Bonaparte intended to emancipate Moldavia and Wallachia as a result of the expedition into Russia, and thus create a new "Dacian Kingdom" in the area of present-day Romania. Partly as a result of this encouragement, Asachi decided to travel back home on 22 June 1812, and, sailing down to Galați, arrived in Iași on 30 August. His designs regarding French protection over the Danubian Principalities were ended by Napoleon's retreat from Russia, and by the restoration of Ottoman suzerainty and Phanariote rule, when Sultan Mahmud II appointed Scarlat Callimachi as Prince.

=== Early lectures and mission to Vienna ===
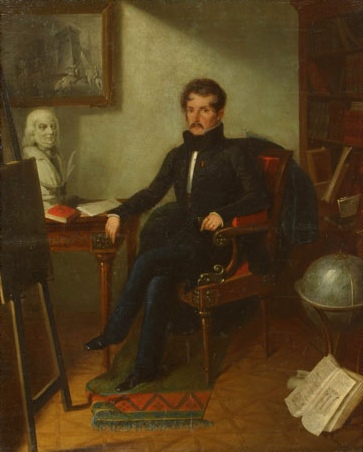
Portrait of a young Asachi, by Giovanni Schiavoni

In reaction to these developments, Gheorghe Asachi centered his attention on cultural improvements, Westernization, and Enlightenment teachings, with support from Metropolitan Veniamin. In 1813, his expertise and familiarity with European languages led Prince Callimachi to appoint him Reviewer (Referandar) for the Department of Foreign Affairs.

In 1814, increasingly opposed to the Greek-language teaching favored by the Phanariotes, Asachi proposed the first in a series of Romanian-language educational institutions, a course in engineering and topography to be held at the Princely Academy in Iași; once approved by the ruler and countersigned by Veniamin, the lectures attracted a number of young boyars (including the future Ottoman diplomat Alexandros Kallimachis, Scarlat's son, Teodor Balș (who was to serve as Moldavia's kaymakam in 1856–1857), Daniel Scavinschi, as well as Gheorghe Asachi's brother Petru. He gave various lectures, and offered additional training in drawing and art history, as well as in Romanian history. He organized several exhibits of his students' work in technical drawing. Despite a favorable report from its inspectors, Asachi's facility soon met with opposition from Greek teachers at the Academy, which led it to be closed soon after its original students graduated (1819).

Nevertheless, Asachi was not stripped of his professorship, and was allowed to maintain both his position as head of the Princely Library and his house on Academy grounds. Later in the same year, he was involved in reorganizing the Orthodox seminary at Iași's Socola Monastery, and traveled to Transylvania in order to enlist the help of scholars active there. His friendly relations with various leaders of the Transylvanian School helped in achieving this goal; in 1820, he returned to Moldavia accompanied by Vasile Fabian Bob, Ioan Costa, Ion Manfi, and Vasile Pop, all of whom became teachers at the Academy.

Early in 1821, Gheorghe Asachi's activities were interrupted when the Greek Filiki Eteria forces crossed the Prut River and took over Moldavia on their way to Wallachia, during what constituted the earliest stage of the Greek War of Independence. Like his father (who died in 1825), Metropolitan Veniamin, and many other notable Moldavians, Asachi fled into Russian territory. He returned the following year, as the Ottoman Empire retook the region and put an end to Phanariote rule (a measure which attracted Asachi's enthusiasm); the new prince, Ioan Sturdza, appointed him Moldavian representative to the Austrian Empire, an office which he held between 30 November 1822 and February 1827. With this, he was awarded the traditional rank of Great Comis, and thus joined the ranks of nobility. As a diplomat, Asachi was foremost noted for his contacts with nationalist intellectuals who represented various ethnicities subject to the Austrian Empire.

While in Vienna, he met the Austrian woman Elena Tauber, former governess of the Sturdza children and widow of the merchant Kiriako Melirato; she was his concubine until 1827, when they were married in an Orthodox church in Iași. Tauber had three children from her marriage to Melirato — a girl, Hermiona, and two boys, Alexandru and Dimitrie (later, a mathematician); all of them were adopted by Asachi.

=== Școala Vasiliană and Albina Românească ===
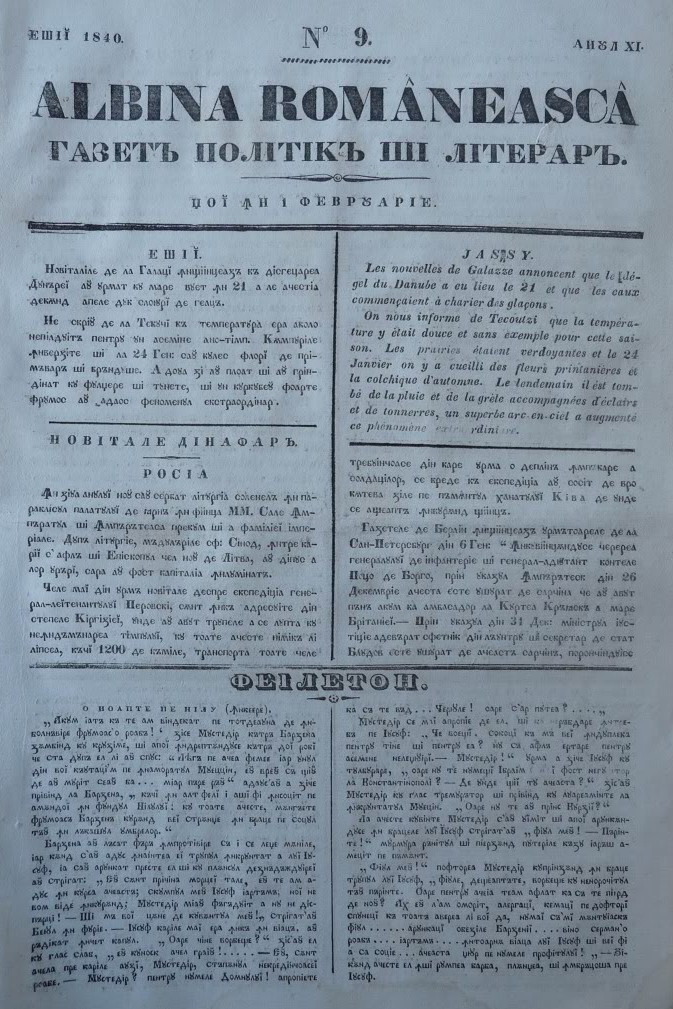
Albina Românească issue no. 9, cover dated 1 February 1840

Soon after returning, Asachi was appointed caretaker of all Moldavian schools and Vel Agha. In March 1828, he succeeded in opening a multilingual upper school and gymnasium, connected to the Trei Ierarhi Church, named Școala Vasiliană or Gimnaziul Vasilian (in honor of the 17th-century prince Vasile Lupu, who had created the original education institution on that site). It was the first modern institution of its kind in Moldavia, and was soon supplemented by a college. Școala Vasiliană also continued the engineering course, taught by Gheorghe Filipescu, and had additional chairs in mathematics, architecture, applied mechanics and hydraulics; in 1834, it sent several of its alumni, including the architect Alexandru Costinescu, for further studies abroad. On 19 July 1827, a great fire in Iași's western quarter destroyed Asachi's lodging, as well as the vast majority of his possessions and manuscripts.

Upon the end of the Russo-Turkish War of 1828–1829, Moldavia and Wallachia again came under Russian administration. During that interval, Asachi decided to expand his educational goals and popularize new ideas through the means of press institutions, and requested approval from the Russian consul in Iaşi, Matvey Minciaky, to have these set up. In April 1829, Russia endorsed his project for a magazine titled Albina Românească, which first saw print in July of the same year. The first periodical to be published in Moldavia, it ran its own printing press, known as Institutul Albinei and originally housed in the Trei Ierarhi area. Alongside its stated goal (which involved generating a literary language), Albina Românească hosted pieces on current events, scientific essays, as well as articles offering practical advice.

Over the following decades, it oversaw the publishing of several other magazines, which were originally designed as supplements; among these, Alăuta Românească (1837–1838) and Foaea Sătească a Prințipatului Moldovei (1839) were initiated by the younger activist Mihail Kogălniceanu, who, through his influential publication Dacia Literară, become a vocal critic of Asachi's political and cultural views. First and foremost, Kogălniceanu expressed his dissatisfaction over the fact that Albina Românească relied on publishing translations from foreign authors, instead of encouraging national specificity.

In addition, Asachi also issued a large panel of related works, including a series of almanacs which ran between 1847 and 1870. Another magazine created by Asachi, the short-lived Spicuitorul Moldo-Român (1841–1842), was published in both Romanian and French, having a Frenchman named Gallice, who worked as a teacher, for its co-editor.

=== Regulamentul Organic adoption ===
In late 1829, through a framework first outlined in the Akkerman Convention, Russian governor Peter Zheltukhin established a board of experts from both countries, charged with drafting the constitutional project eventually known as Regulamentul Organic. The project was delayed by the ongoing war and epidemics of cholera and bubonic plague until 1831–1832, as Pavel Kiselyov took over for Zheltukhin; Gheorghe Asachi served as secretary of the Moldavian board — the body also comprised Mihail Sturdza, Iordache Catagiu, Constantin Cantacuzino-Pașcanu and Costache Conachi.

The membership outlined for the Moldavian board scandalized the lesser boyars, who pointed out that the Akkerman treaties called for the new legislation to be adopted through a vote in a representative Boyar Divan, and who attempted to have Asachi and Conachi recalled. Despite the protests, the board continued its activities, being overseen by the former consul Minciaky; together with Mihail Sturdza and the Wallachian Alexandru Vilara, Asachi was dispatched to Saint Petersburg to obtain the approval of Emperor Nicholas I, which led to the document being enforced in both Principalities. In its final version, the Regulament endorsed his efforts as educator, regulating public education and transferring assets donated by Vasile Lupu to Școala Vasiliană.

The trade regulations offered by the Regulament were welcomed with enthusiasm by Asachi, prompting him to write an ode in their honor, titled Annul nou al moldo-românilor 1830, în care s-a lucrat Regulamentul organic, acel întâi cod administrativ al Moldovei ("The New Year of the Moldo-Romanians 1830, in Which Regulamentul Organic, the First Administrative Code of Moldavia, Was Completed"). In sharp contrast to his later advocacy, Asachi attempted to introduce provisions for the two Principalities' union, and some of his interventions in the text were meant to facilitate this project. At the time, he took a compassionate view in respect to peasants, denouncing the exploitation of their labor by the boyars.

=== Under Mihail Sturdza ===
Gheorghe Asachi was deeply impressed by the institutions he saw functioning in the Russian capital, and did his best to replicate them in Moldavia. After his return from Russia, Asachi became head of the Moldavian National Archives, in which capacity he published the first collection of documents referring to the country's history. From early 1834 onwards, he was a main collaborator of the newly appointed prince and former colleague on the Moldavian board, Mihail Sturdza, receiving funds and benefiting from an order to prioritize education in "Moldavian" (Romanian).

In July of the same year, Asachi visited the Wallachian capital of Bucharest, being charged by Minciaky with strengthening the common framework of the Regulament by ensuring that its two versions did not differ in content. By May 1833, he was able to move into a new house, which he designed and erected in the Muntenimea area of Copou Hill, on a large plot of land he had purchased from Lupu Balș; at around the same time, Institutul Albinei was also reopened on the new location. An 1852 survey showed that Asachi had a second, smaller, house in downtown Iași.

In late 1834, at Asachi's request, Sturdza gave approval for the first Moldavian girls' school to be opened in the capital. On 6 June 1835, following Asachi's interventions, Academia Mihăileană, the first Romanian-language institution of higher education, was established in the city. A fundamental institution of higher learning, and the nucleus for the present-day University of Iași, it also hosted lectures by cultural figures from Moldavia, Transylvania and Wallachia alike, including some of Asachi's young rivals; among the teachers were Mihail Kogălniceanu, Ion Ionescu de la Brad, Eftimie Murgu, Ion Ghica, and August Treboniu Laurian. In addition, Asachi presented a plan to create a school of agronomy, to function alongside the city's military academy, and, by 1848, created a school for further qualification in engineering.

On 15 November 1836, he founded, alongside Vornic Ștefan Catargiu and Spătar Alecsandri (the father of poet Vasile Alecsandri), a conservatory, and, after 1837, was appointed head of the Moldavian Theater, among the first of its kind to showcase original pieces in Romanian. At the head of a committee, he took charge of translating a German-language dictionary into Romanian, stressing that this was a response to the Moldavians' need for knowledge. During the early 1840s, he became interested in organizing education for the non-emancipated Armenian and Jewish communities — in 1842, it was as a result of his efforts that an Armenian primary school was set up.

In 1847, Asachi's printing press issued an Armenian-language primer. He was also the person behind the creation of the Iași School of Arts and Crafts (January 1841), as well as helping establish the first public library, the paper mill near Piatra Neamț, an art gallery, and a National History Museum. In the meantime, Academia Mihăileană was disestablished and transformed into a French-language school (overseen by a teacher named Malgouverné).

Over the same decade, Asachi moved towards Conservatism, defending Regulamentul Organic in opposition to the increasingly popular liberal current. He clashed with young activists who rejected Sturdza's rule, and, as early as 1839, noted with dissatisfaction that "a new people was born [...], with new wishes and ideas". His conflict with Kogălniceanu was transported to the field of politics, and Asachi joined in condemning the anti-Regulament failed rebellion of 1848. As most other press venues submitted to the minimal requirement of Russian officials and avoided publishing any material related to the revolution, Albina Românească criticized the revolutionaries for having discarded "their duty to the powers that be", and praised Russia for sending its troops to combat "anarchy". Despite this, Kogălniceanu later claimed that, on one occasion, he had seen Asachi sobbing over having been made to criticize the Romanian activists.

The debate prolonged itself over the following years, and, coupled with Asachi's unwavering support for Sturdza, saw him joining the separatist camp at a time the post-revolutionary group Partida Națională began openly campaigning for Moldo-Wallachian unification. While supporting the interests of the middle class, Asachi stressed that these could complement a feudal system, and rejected the revolutionary call for abolishing privilege.

Also in 1848, Asachi lost his daughter, the 19-year-old Eufrosina, to the cholera outbreak. He published two poems written in her memory.

=== 1850s ===
In January 1850, almost one year after the Convention of Balta Liman awarded the Moldavian throne to the reform-minded and revolutionary sympathizer Grigore Alexandru Ghica, Albina Românească changed its name to Gazeta de Moldavia, adopting an official tone. Asachi, who resigned his positions as inspector and archivist in 1849, was awarded a substantial pension. Between 1851 and 1854, he was head of censorship, using this position to award imprimatur for reformist ideas (with Prince Ghica's tacit approval). At the time, he gave endorsement to the Chronicle of Huru, a document which was claimed to trace a direct lineage between Roman Dacia and Moldavia, and to clarify the more mysterious aspects of the country's early medieval history — the document was used by separatists to emphasize Moldavia's tradition of independence, but was the subject to an inquiry and dismissed by Kogălniceanu (it was later established that the text was a forgery).

During the political battles which followed Ghica's retirement and the Crimean War, Gazeta de Moldavia transformed itself into an official platform for the anti-unionist camp. After the retreat of Russian troops and an interval of Austrian administration, Moldavia and Wallachia's government came under the direct supervision of various European powers, and Kaymakam Teodor Balș ensured the interregnum in Iași. In this context, Ottoman authorities, through the voice of Fuat Pasha, gave their approval for relative freedom of the press to be legislated. With Costache Negruzzi, Asachi again became an official censor, while again assuming the offices of archivist and inspector of Moldavian schools.

As the Treaty of Paris imposed the creation of ad hoc Divans, through which the two countries' inhabitants were allowed to decide their future, the unionist camp saw a chance for fulfilling its goals; Asachi and his associates reacted vehemently, and, in May 1857, complained to the Porte that unification would bring about various perils. One month later, the government of Kaymakam Nicolae Vogoride carried out an electoral fraud to yield a separatist majority in the ad hoc Divan — Asachi, who supported Sturdza's bid for the throne, is thought to have played a major part in bringing this about, and, together with Vogoride himself, Nicolae Istrati, and the Austrian consul Oskar von Gödel-Lannoy, to have drawn up falsified the electoral lists. He was himself a candidate in the Iași electoral college, receiving 197 votes and placing second among the representatives it sent to the Divan. His magazine stood alone in claiming that the regime had acted impartially.

The suffrage was hotly contested and annulled through an agreement between the France and Great Britain; Asachi himself was thus forced to note that the new elections in August managed to overturn the previous results. He was no longer elected a deputy, and his candidature for the position of secretary of the electoral board was awarded just one vote. In 1858, Gazeta de Moldavia was entirely dedicated to political subjects and support for Vogoride's policies, and ceased print in October, as the Kaymakam ended his mandate. In late November, it reemerged under the title Patria, which continued to criticize Partida Națională from a conservative position, notably hosting articles by the anti-unionist Istrati. As a new regency of three was preparing elections, the magazine rallied with Ștefan Catargiu, Asachi's lifelong collaborator and the separatist representative in the body of kaymakams, against the two unionists (Vasile Sturdza and Anastasie Panu), before Catargiu was replaced with I. A. Cantacuzino. In November 1837, Asachi and another 36 separatist boyars issued a memorandum unsuccessfully asking the Ottoman Grand Vizier Aali Pasha to intervene against the unionist kaymakams, restore censorship, and to narrow down the electoral lists.

=== Final years ===
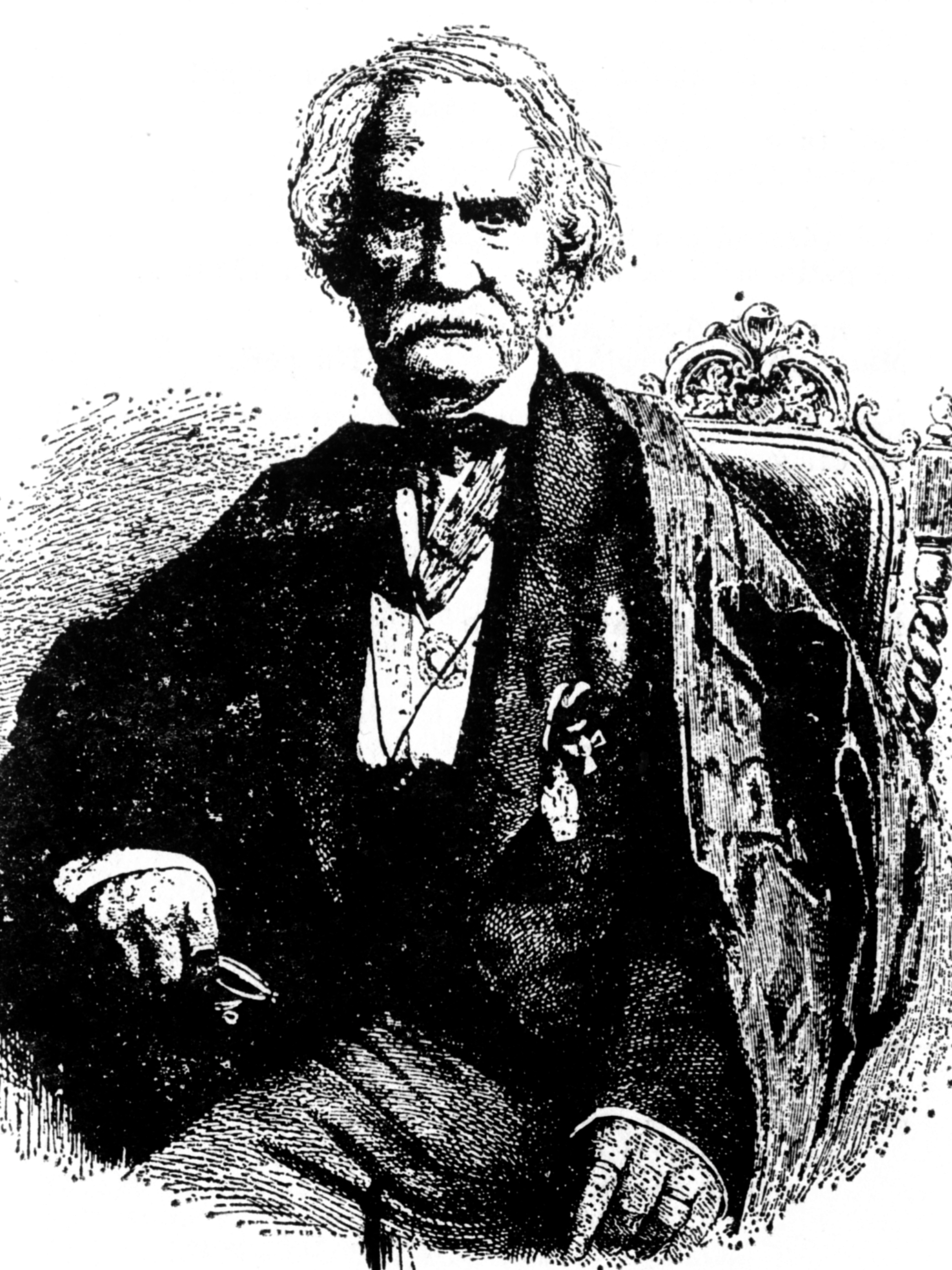
Asachi in old age (portrait originally printed in the first edition of his collected short stories)

The situation changed in January 1859, when Partida Națională was able to ensure the election of Alexandru Ioan Cuza as both Prince of Moldavia and Prince of Wallachia, in what was the de facto union of the two countries. After congratulating Cuza on his accomplishment, Asachi authored a poem titled Odă la Dumnezeu ("An Ode to God"), which proclaimed the brotherhood of Romanians and the notion that "power resides in Unity". Patria drastically reduced its articles in support of separation, while allocating most of its space to reprinting official papers. Nevertheless, as Domnitor Cuza was deposed and the election of a foreign ruler over the Romanian Principality was being assessed, it is probable that Gheorghe Asachi again switched to a separatist stance: on 14 April 1866, after an incident during which Iași crowds protested the prolongation of unification beyond Cuza's reign, he was the subject of an inquiry on charges of sedition. This remains a mysterious aspect of his political career, and it is certain that Asachi eventually rallied with Carol later in the year. It is likely, however, that his inconsistent views prompted other intellectuals to reject his participation in founding the Romanian Academy.

The various projects also involved Asachi's own financial reserves, which led him to become indebted and mortgage his assets on several occasions: in 1862, after Asachi was declared insolvent, the Copou house was put up for auction, but the writer was able to come up with the money before the sale was completed. He continued to depend on loans in order to feed his family, and unsuccessfully offered Institutul Albinei to be purchased by the state. In February 1869, the Dimitrie Ghica government awarded Asachi a yearly pension of 8,888 lei, "for the important services he has brought to the country from 1813 to 1862". He died several months later in Iași, and was buried at the Patruzeci de Sfinți Church. His printing press ceased its activity in 1867.

== Literature ==
=== Style and subjects ===
During his youth, Asachi was one of the most representative members of an idealist generation of Moldavian intellectuals. In the context of early Romanian literature, where Romanticism and delayed Classicism coexisted, Asachi, like Grigore Alexandrescu, George Baronzi and others, tended to side with the latter, at a time when his counterpart in Bucharest, Ion Heliade Rădulescu, bridged the gap between the two schools. The literary critic Garabet Ibrăileanu concluded that Asachi's literature signified a transition between a Classicist stage exemplified by Costache Conachi and younger Romantics such as Vasile Alecsandri and Dimitrie Bolintineanu (he also concluded that the casual comparisons made between Heliade Rădulescu and Asachi had failed to note that the former was not a conservative). Gheorghe Asachi recommended his students to study Italian literature, and would frown upon models inspired by French literature.

His works included poems, the first of which were written in Italian, as well as vast array of short stories and novellas, through which Asachi attempted to create a legendary history partly mirroring Romanian mythology. The major influences on his work were Renaissance authors such as Petrarch, Ludovico Ariosto, and Torquato Tasso, but he also accommodated more modern influences, such as Salvator Rosa, Thomas Gray, Gottfried August Bürger, Vasily Zhukovsky, Lord Byron and Friedrich Schiller.

Thus, Asachi created himself a fictional location, called Dochia — a reference to both Dacia and the myth of Baba Dochia, which houses the Ceahlău Massif under the name of Pion. Asachi was also the first person to mention Baba Dochia in connection to the Roman Emperor Trajan and the Dacian Wars — the vague and unprecedented references make it likely that he actually invented the original story as well. References to this universe are also present in an eponymous novella about Dragoș, the first Prince of Moldavia, which partly drew on old chronicles, and partly displayed Asachi's own fictional devices. The story centers on Harboe, a chivalrous Tatar ruler who resides in the Cumanian town of Romidava, who falls in love with Branda, the daughter of a Moesian lord and would-be wife of Dragoș. Dochia's hidden altar, referred to as "a simulacrum", is guarded by a Vestal-like priestess and a deer hind. Asachi's other prose works on historical subjects take similar liberties with their subjects (they notably describe large Gothic monuments and tournaments in medieval Moldavia, as well as improbable details from the lives of 14th–16th century Princes Bogdan I, Stephen the Great, and Petru Rareș).

Asachi's works also include romanticized accounts of a journey made by the Cossack Hetman Ivan Mazepa into Moldavia (Mazepa în Moldova) and the life of Ruxandra, daughter of Vasile Lupu and wife of Tymofiy Khmelnytsky (Rucsandra Doamna), as well as Jijia, where a captured fairy recounts her previous existence as a Christian martyr, and Sirena lacului, where a dishonored maiden, who has turned into a siren, takes revenge on boyar.

In connection with Nicolae Vogoride's policies, Asachi drew on historical subject to counter the calls for unity voiced by Partida Națională; in addition to the endorsement he gave to the Chronicle of Huru, he emphasized, in an article of June 1857, the campaign led by Stephen the Great into Wallachia, calling for a landmark to be raised in honor of "the vanquisher of the Wallachians". This mirrored the earlier comments made by the Wallachian anti-unionist Dimitrie Papazoglu, who proposed a celebration and monument honoring the 1653 Battle of Finta (during which the Wallachian forces of Matei Basarab had defeated an army of Moldavians and Cossacks).

Gheorghe Asachi's style has been criticized from the time of his debate with other intellectuals of his age, when Mihail Kogălniceanu argued that his lyrical works were mere replicas of foreign models. Several influential literary historians of the 20th century expressed similar views: George Călinescu indicated that, in general, poems by Asachi sounded "banal"; in one of his essays, Paul Zarifopol commented that Asachi and his generation, from Iancu Văcărescu to Vasile Cârlova, Alexandru Hrisoverghi, and Heliade Rădulescu, were "semi-cultured" and "amateurs". Both Călinescu and Zarifopol stressed that, in his best work, Asachi announced the poetic language of Mihai Eminescu, the most influential Romanian author of the late 19th century.

=== Language ===
Present at the forefront during debates regarding the shape of literary language, Asachi drew criticism for introducing archaisms and marginally used neologisms to the Romanian lexis, as well as for the forms of spelling he encouraged. Commenting on a series of words which are nowhere used outside his novellas and poems, George Călinescu called them "impossible [...], presently seeming bizarre, mostly Romantic, lacking in historical perception".

In essence, Asachi called for the modern language to reflect as much as possible the one used by the people — in this respect, he came closer to Kogălniceanu's views than to those of Heliade Rădulescu (at a time when the latter favored using the dialects employed by the Romanian Orthodox and Greek-Catholic churches). One of the first to discover old Moldavian chronicles and recommend them for reading, he came to propose that the Moldavian dialect, as reflected in these, could be used as a template for the modern speech. Nevertheless, his views fluctuated, and he was noted for proposing himself that the Church language be used as a template, while contrasting the support he gave to Westernization in general with his distaste for popular French-sounding neologisms.

In an article he published in 1847, Asachi defined himself as a partisan of "the juste milieu" on language matters, and recommended adopting words and rules of grammar with moderation, and from all sources available. According to the literary critic Garabet Ibrăileanu, "[...] anybody who has ever read anything of what this writer has authored knows that he has a language of his own, a characteristic one, resembling those of many writers, without resemblig that of anyone else to the point where we could place him in any category." The same commentator nonetheless noted that there were clear similarities between the way in which Asachi used Romanian and the language favored by Costache Conachi.

His enduring aversion towards Western neologisms, as well as towards the Latin-based linguistic purism favored by many Transylvanian scholars, made Asachi a predecessor of the Bukovinian academic Aron Pumnul. However, in his later years, Asachi came to praise and uphold Heliade Rădulescu's controversial advocacy in favor of modifying Romanian on the basis of Italian (with its claim that the two languages were in fact closely related dialects of Latin).

The Iași National Theatre

Asachi's experimentations with the Romanian Latin alphabet were noted for their inconsistencies, and criticized as such by Kogălniceanu (who, as an example, pointed out that Asachi had alternatively used "tch", "tz", "c", and "cz" to mark the voiceless postalveolar affricate).

=== Asachi and the Romanian theater ===
Considered, together with the Wallachian Heliade Rădulescu, the founder of early Romanian theater, Asachi produced the first staging of a Romanian-language play, first performed for the public on 27 December 1816, at the Ghica family manor. The work was his own adaptation of Myrtil et Chloé, a pastoral theme authored by Solomon Gessner and retaken by Jean-Pierre Claris de Florian; in its printed version, the text also featured illustrations drawn by his own hand. Extremely popular, Asachi's play was celebrated for helping to counter the perceived xenophily of the early 19th century Moldavian cultural environment. Two Ghicas and a Sturdza were assigned parts in the first staging, and Veniamin Costachi was present in the audience.

In early 1837, his conservatory began functioning regularly, which coincided with Asachi's leadership of the National Theatre. Before and after this moment, the writer contributed translations from various prestigious dramatists and playwrights, August von Kotzebue, Voltaire, Jean Racine and Nikolai Gogol among them. In parallel, he published librettos for popular operas, thus lending a hand to the development of local operatic theater.

== Contribution to visual arts ==
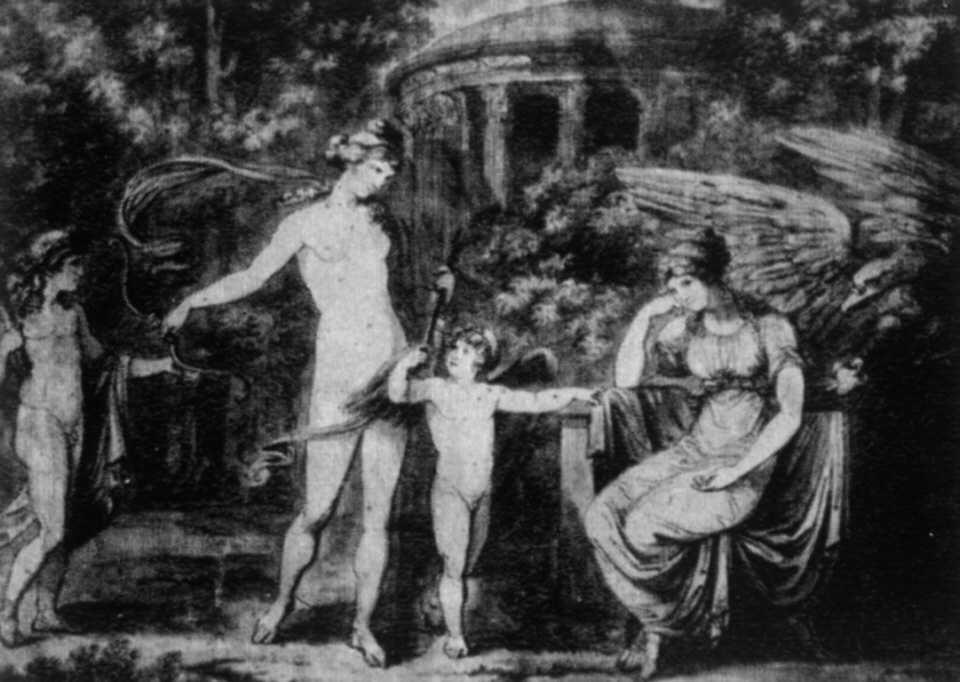
Templul Iubirii ("The Temple of Love"), drawing by Gheorghe Asachi

As a teacher, Asachi assisted and encouraged the development of Romanian art. Before he came to exercise his influence, Moldavian art was essentially dependent on boyar patronage, and, by the turn of the 18th century, had come to focus on portrait painting. Asachi centered his energies on introducing Romantic nationalist themes and popularizing new trends. He integrated painting, architecture, and drawing and oil painting in classes taught at Academia Mihăileană (called class de zugrăvie, an antiquated version of "painting course"), and introduced lithography through the means of his printing press.

In the 1830s and 1840s, he encouraged artists the copying and publishing of paintings and drawings with historical themes. Asachi emphasized the educational aspects of zugrăvitura istorică în oloiu ("history painting in oil"), and intended its creations to reach as wide an audience as possible. In this respect as well, his contributions were equivalent to those of Heliade Rădulescu, who opened the first museum in Wallachia (1837).

The resulting works are generally naïve in quality, and inaccurate in their reconstruction of historical scenes. Gheorghe Panaiteanu Bardasare, the recipient of a scholarship to the Akademie der Bildenden Künste in Munich, was the only one of his many disciples to remain under the influence of Asachi's tenets for the rest of his life, developing these into academic art. Asachi's disciples also included Gheorghe Lemeni, who studied in Munich and Rome, and the minor artist Gheorghe Năstăseanu.

Arguably, Asachi's most important contribution to the artistic field was his involvement in attracting foreign painters to the Moldavian scene, by offering them commissions or educational assignments; among these were the Polish Ludwik Stawski and Mauriciu Loeffler, the Italian Giovanni Schiavoni, as well as the Austrian Josef Adler (noted for authoring an 1833 manual for landscape painting and still life works) and Ioan Müller (who taught figurative art). Of them, Asachi reportedly considered Schiavoni to be the most competent, while he tended to replace most others after reexamining their skills. Another important Italian artist who arrived in Iași during that period was the former Carboneria revolutionary Niccolò Livaditti, to whom Asachi did not, however, assign a teaching post. In 1843, four years before the Iași Academia was radically transformed, the art classes were disestablished due to the protest of various boyars (who objected to the fact that members of all social groups could attend them).

Gheorghe Asachi's own works, many of which date back to the time he spent in Rome, show the influence of Classicism. Noted for their rigorous use of artistic conventions and nature study, they are nonetheless considered inferior to both their creator's contributions to other cultural fields and the works of many other painters active in Moldavia at the time. Asachi himself is known to have sketched out works which were completed by his foreign collaborators or students (among these is a since-lost painting of Stephen the Great facing his mother, signed by the Italian artist Giani, and an 1845 painting of Moldavians in the battle of Malbork Castle). A series of Classicist drawings from the early decades of the 19th century have only tentatively been attributed to Asachi.

== Descendants ==
Elena, Gheorghe Asachi's widow, died in 1877. Of his adopted children, Dimitrie Asachi was to be the most famous: a pupil of his stepfather's, he was to author the first original book on mathematics in his country (1841). Alexandru Asachi, who joined the Romanian Army and became an officer, was himself known as an artist: a lithographer and author of historical works, he published several albums of hand-colored prints during the 1850s.

In 1835, Hermiona Asachi (whose given name was often Francised as Hermione) fell in love with Alexandru, the underage son of former Prince Alexander Mourousis, who soon after moved into Asachi's house; this scandalized other members of the Mourousis family, and the conflict was ended only when the two youths agreed to marry. They had a son, George Moruzi, who died in 1856. In 1843, Hermiona translated and published Silvio Pellico's collection of maxims, Dei doveri degli uomini. She got married a second time, in 1852, to the well-known French historian Edgar Quinet (between 1841 and 1845, she had attended Quinet's lectures at the Collège de France); five years later, Asachi translated and Quinet's collected works into Romanian — according to historian Nicolae Iorga, the edition was toned-down and censored. The Quinets did not have any children.

== Landmarks and portrayals ==
Rectorate of the Gheorghe Asachi Technical University of Iași

In autumn 1890, a statue of Asachi was erected in front of the Trei Ierarhi Church school complex, an initiative taken by a group of his conservative collaborators. On the same occasion, Asachi's remains, together with those of his wife Elena, were placed in the monument's base. The courtyard of Asachi's house on Copou Hill hosts a small monument, which he raised to the memory of his daughter Eufrosina and his grandson George.

Asachi laid out the plan for a monument honoring Regulamentul Organic, completed by the Russian artist Sungurov with workforce hired from Galicia, and raised on Copou as the first structure of its kind in Moldavia. He is also noted for having proposed, in 1853, to create a modern cemetery in Iași on Galata Hill — his project was never used, but in 1871, Eternitatea, a cemetery corresponding to his requirements, was set up on land donated to the city.

The Copou house itself was taken over by Malvina Czapkai, a creditor of Asachi and his son Alexandru; it served as a boarding school, and, during the Russo-Turkish War of 1877–1878, as a Russian military hospital. In 1892, Marie of Edinburgh, who had just married the Romanian heir apparent, Ferdinand, purchased it for 52,000 lei. It was subsequently the Principesa Maria School for Arts and Crafts, destined to women's education, and, during World War I, served as a home for orphaned girls. In 1937, Queen Marie transformed into an institute for welfare, which notably hosted the practice of sociologist and psychologist Mihai Ralea. The house was again a hospital in World War II, when it was taken over by the Romanian Air Force; in 1948, when the Communist regime was established, it was nationalized (together with all other Royal property), and served as the headquarters of the Romanian Land Forces 4th Corps, and was later rented for private use. Since 1976, it has housed two institutes of the Romanian Academy (the Alexandru Philippide Institute of Philology and the Gheorghe Zane Institute of Economic and Social Research).

Among the artists two have depicted Asachi during his lifetime were his associate Giovanni Schiavoni (whose painting shows the young writer surrounded by objects illustrating his many interests) and Constantin Daniel Stahi (a pupil of Panaiteanu Berdasare). In December 1937, a section of the University of Iași was turned into an institute of technology, with the name of Gheorghe Asachi Polytechnic School (the present-day Gheorghe Asachi Technical University of Iași). A public library in the city also bears his name, as do a school erected in 1900 on the site previously occupied by Școala Vasiliană and high schools in the Romanian cities of Botoșani and Sibiu, as well as in the Moldovan capital Chișinău.

== Cited sources ==
- Călinescu, George (1983) Istoria literaturii române. Compendiu, Editura Minerva, Bucharest.
- (in Romanian) Cărăbuș, Gheorghe Gabriel (2004)"Asachi – un separatist avant la lettre", in Codrul Cosminului, Nr.10, at the Ștefan cel Mare University of Suceava; retrieved 3 July 2007
- Djuvara, Neagu (1995) Între Orient și Occident. Țările române la începutul epocii moderne, Humanitas, Bucharest. ISBN 973-28-0523-4
- Drăguț, Vasile; Florea, Vasile; Grigorescu, Dan and Mihalache, Marin (1970) Pictura românească în imagini, Editura Meridiane, Bucharest. OCLC 5717220
- Măciucă, Constantin (1978) "Prefață", p. V-XXXV, in Ion Heliade Rădulescu, Scrieri alese, Editura Albatros, Bucharest. OCLC 16207716
- Oprescu, George (ed.) (1958) Scurtă istorie a artelor plastice în R.P.R., Editura Academiei RPR, Bucharest. OCLC 7162839
