= Luigi Boscolo =

Italian engraver (1823–1906)

Cav. Luigi Boscolo
- Born: Luigi Antonio Boscolo; 21 March 1823; Rovigo, Lombardy–Venetia, Austrian Empire
- Died: 14 February 1906 (aged 82); Rovigo, Veneto, Kingdom of Italy
- Burial place: Cemetery of Rovigo; 45.069606°N 11.803500°E
- Education: Venice Academy of Fine Arts; Brera Academy of Fine Arts, Milan
- Occupation: Engraver
- Years active: 1840–1890
- Notable work: La Fornarina (after Raphael); La Maddalena (after Natale Schiavoni); Madonna della seggiola (after Raphael); Madonna con putto o del pomo (after Giovanni Bellini); Cardinale Pietro Silvestri; Francesco Morosini, Doge of Venice; The Royal Family of Italy
- Parents: Luigi Boscolo (father); Caterina Squarza (mother)
- Awards: Cavaliere

Luigi Antonio Boscolo (Italian pronunciation: [luˈiːdʒi anˈtɔːnjo ˈboskolo, - ˈbɔs-]; 21 March 1823 – 14 February 1906) was an Italian engraver, active in Venice and Rovigo.

== Biography ==
Born in Rovigo, he first studied in his hometown, proving a great talent for drawing and painting. His teacher Antonio Bernati, architect, painter, engraver, helped him to obtain a scholarship to study at the Accademia di Belle Arti of Venice. He was so clever that he became soon an assistant of his teacher in his atelier. He was to become professor at the Accademia di Belle Arti of Venice too, and later knighted. He was a defender of The Serenessima Republic of Venice or, better to say, the Republic of San Marco against the Austro-Hungarian Army, during its short life in the years 1948 and 1849.

Among his engravings are those of The Bathers by Francesco Hayez, the Magdalen by Natale Schiavoni, works given an award by the Academy of Fine Arts of Milan; The Odalisque also by Schiavoni; a portrait of Carlo Goldoni by Alessandro Longhi, engravings awarded by the Academy of Belle Arti in Venice; the Madonna del Pomo by Giovanni Bellini; a portrait of Malatesta Buglioni by the painter Raffaele Giannetti of Genoa; La Sorpresa del Bechi di Firenze; Torquato Tasso at the Hospital Sant'Anna in Ferrara, and the Poet Camoens or better Camões in prison by the painter Luigi Moretti of Venice; and finally five portraits of King Vittorio Emanuele, King Umberto, of Cardinal Silvestri of Rovigo, Conte Spiridione Papadopoli of Venice, and Conte Luigi Camerini of Padua. Traniello and Stocco listed 43 works (subject, if after, where, year, numbers) after the exhibition dedicated to Luigi Boscolo in Rovigo in October 1969.

Though he wasn't a rich man, he gave up the opportunity to work at the Bank of Italy to keep his artistic freedom.

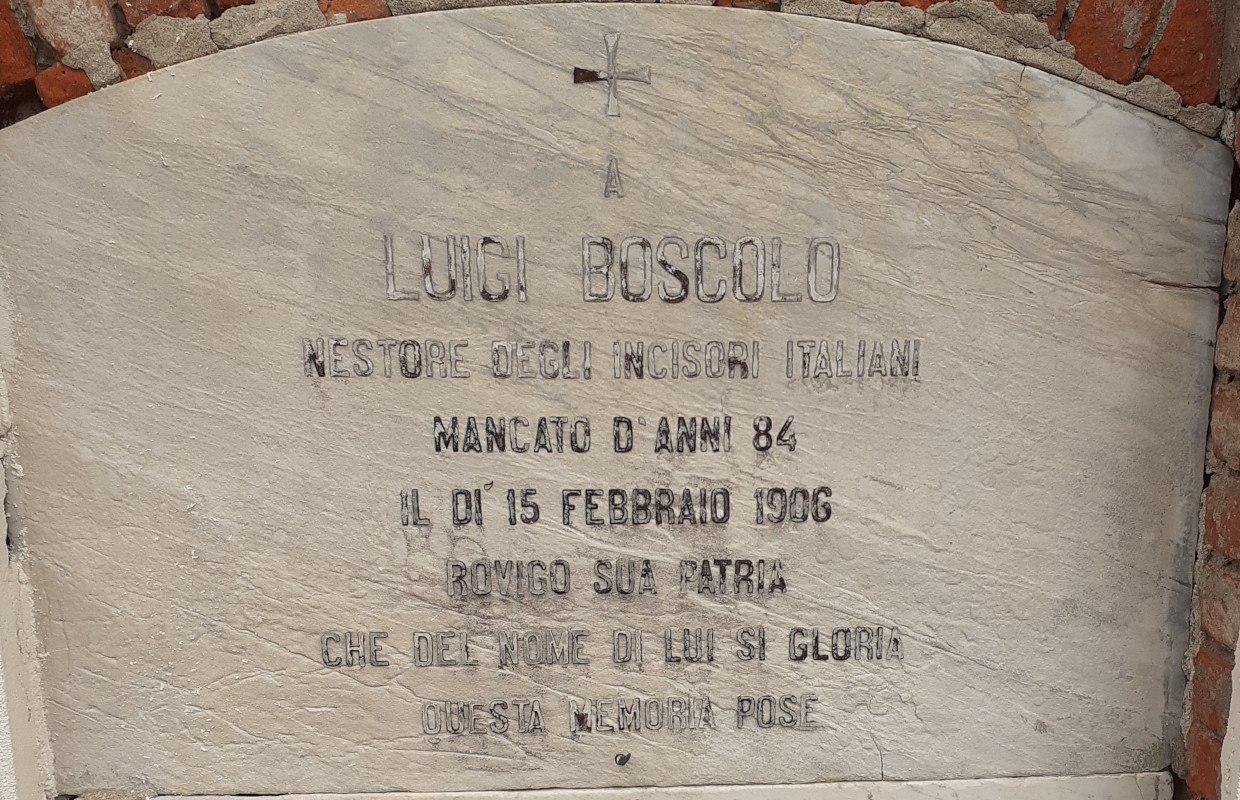
Luigi Boscolo Engraver Tomb - Cemetery of Rovigo Italy

He lived and worked in Venice for over 20 years (1875–1889); when he came in Rovigo back, he was now old and his health was poor. He gave all his engraved copper plates to the Municipaly and Accademia dei Concordi of Rovigo and the Municipality gave him a life annuality to add to his pension.

During his life he was a student, a teacher and a member of the Accademia di Belle Arti of Venice and a member (since 1854) and artistic inspector of Accademia dei Concordi in Rovigo.

In 1917, after the Battle of Caporetto - World War I, his most important works were sent from Rovigo to Palazzo Venezia in Rome for safety reasons.

In Rovigo, Luigi Boscolo street is in the oldest part of the town, by side Piazza Merlin (ex Piazza Roma), the old Ghetto, the medieval walls, the ancient Porta San Bortolo.

He died very alert but worn out, 82 years old, at the Civil Hospital in Rovigo. His tomb is in the Cemetery of Rovigo; epitaph/epigraph: ...Nestore degli incisori italiani...; Nestor means reliable wise senior advisor of Italian engravers.

== Gallery ==
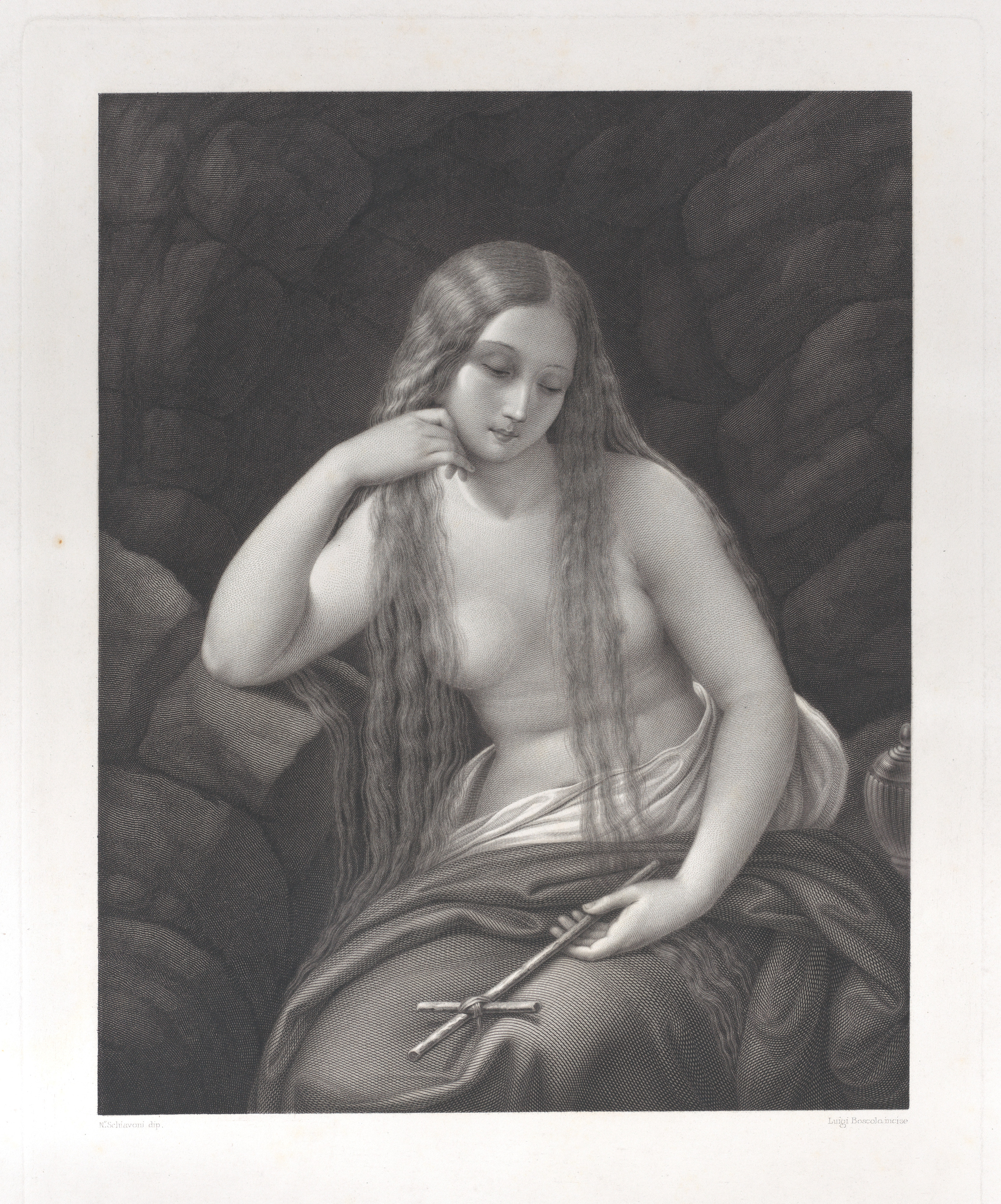
The penitent Mary Magdalene in the wilderness, holding a cross in her left hand MET DP883309

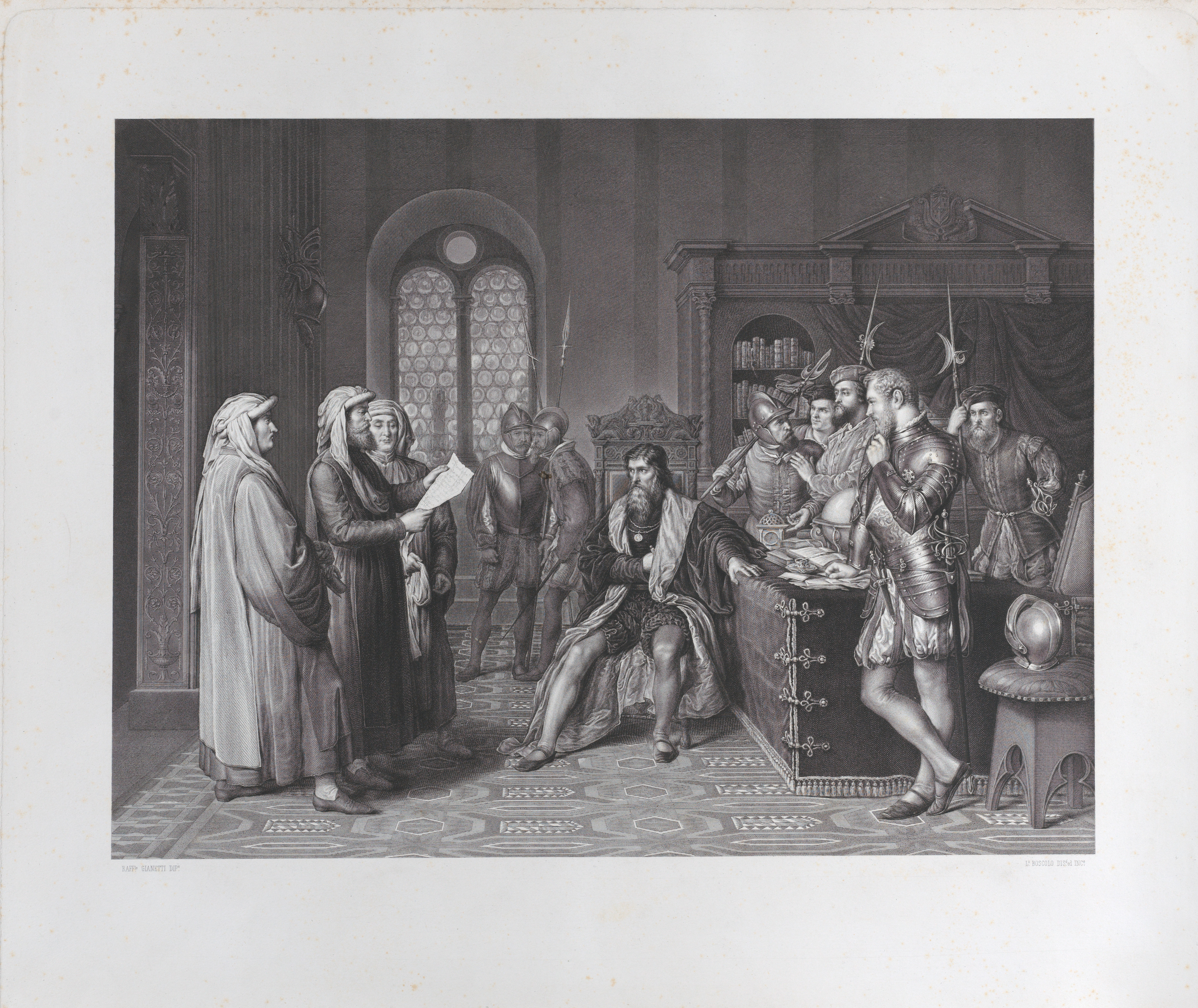
Scene with Columbus Met DP885620

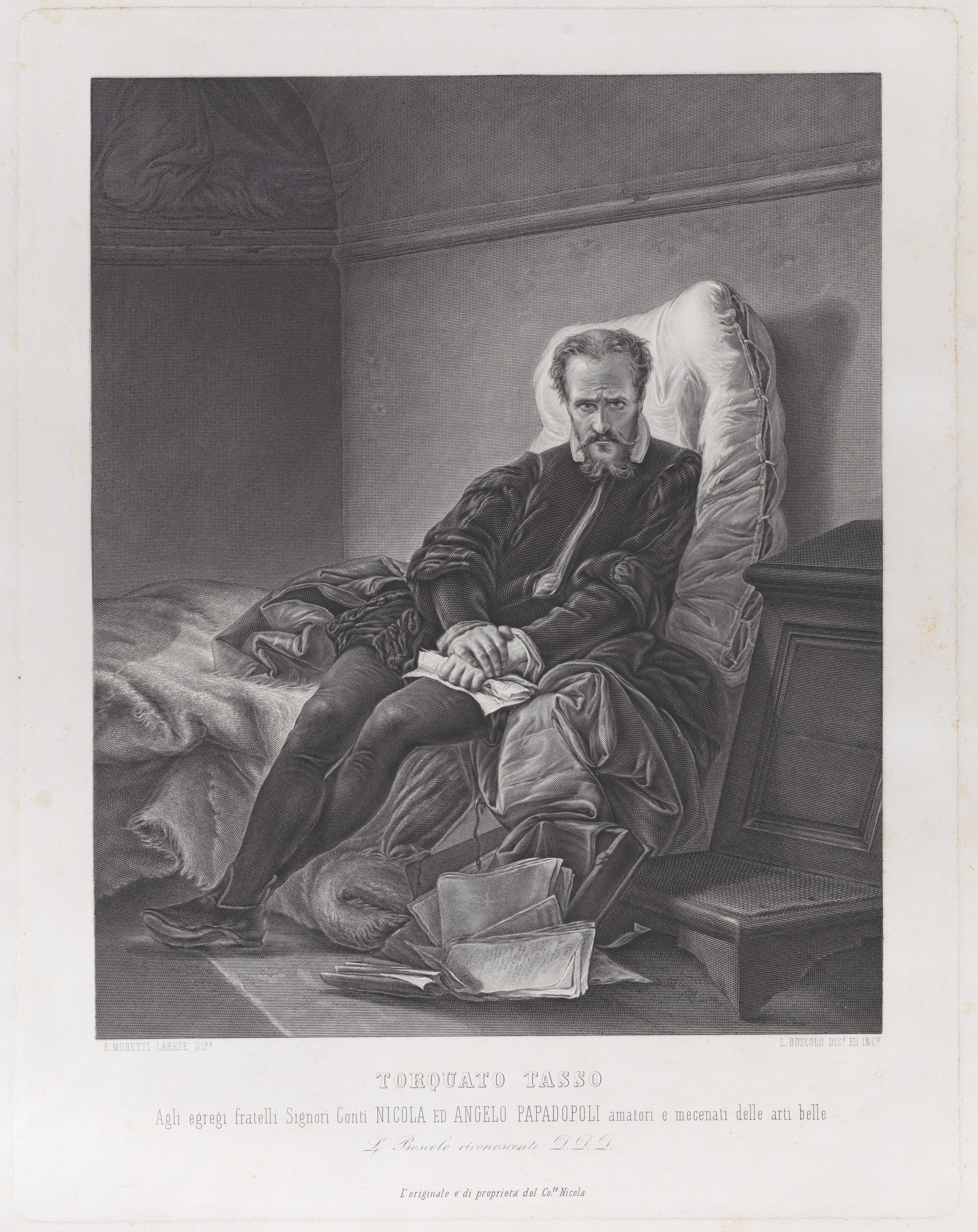
Torquato Tasso at the Ospedale Sant Anna MET DP883560

== Works ==
- La Fornarina, after Raphael, 1844, maybe his first important job (he was only 21 years old)
- La Maddalena, after Natale Schiavoni, 1846
- Madonna della seggiola, after Raphael, 1864
- Madonna con putto / del pomo, after Giovanni Bellini, 1853/1858
- Cardinale Pietro Silvestri, 1859
- Francesco Morosini Doge of Venice, 1884, maybe his latest very important job
- Victor Emmanuel II King of Italy
- Umberto I of Italy King of Italy
- Margherita of Savoy Queen of Italy
- Victor Emmanuel III King of Italy

== Bibliography ==
- Bagatin, Pier Luigi (2024). I Concordi di Rovigo. Profilo storico della pluricentenaria Accademia e del suo speciale legame con Rovigo e il Polesine (in Italian). Antilia. ISBN 979-12-80267-22-1.
- Pizzamano, Paola; Sigolo, Alfredo; Tchaprassian, Mihran (2023). Dizionario degli artisti nati o attivi in Polesine nel XIX e XX secolo (in Italian). Apogeo Editore. ISBN 979-12-81386-07-5.
- Pietropoli, Giuseppe (2017). L'Accademia dei Concordi nella vita rodigina, ristampa con aggiornamenti al 2013 a cura di Adriano Mazzetti, Ennio Raimondi e Luciano Zerbinati (in Italian). Rovigo: Accademia dei Concordi.
- Traniello, Leobaldo; Stocco, Luigi (1969). Luigi Boscolo incisore (in Italian). Rovigo: I.P.A.G.
- de Gubernatis, A.; Matini, U. (1889). Dizionario degli artisti italiani viventi, pittori, scultori e architetti (in Italian). Le Monnier. p. 69. (wrong birth date and place)
- "Search Results for Luigi Boscolo". Benezit Dictionary of Artists. 31 October 2011. (wrong birth date and place)
