= Felice Schiavoni =

Italian painter (1803–1881)

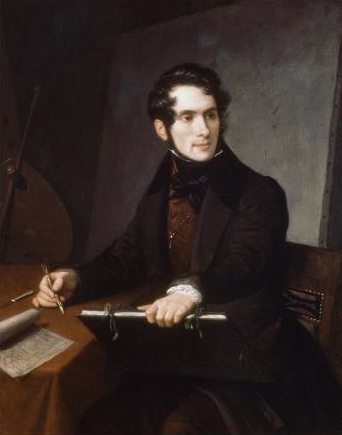
Felice Schiavoni: portrait by his father Natale.

Felice Schiavoni (19 March 1803 – 30 June 1881) was an Italian painter, depicting history, genre, and portraits. During his early career, he often collaborated with his father, the painter Natale Schiavoni.

== Biography ==
Felice was born in Trieste. He was first a pupil of his father, and he then studied at the Brera Academy in Milan, where he won a prize, and later at Venice and Vienna. He was awarded a prize and medal by Tsar Nicholas I of Russia.

He often painted in Venice for Russian patrons. Among his works are a Death of Raphael Sanzio painted during a period of 15 years for Tsar Alexander II of Russia, and for which he was paid 60 thousand Lire. The large canvas was a scholarly tour-de-force which included 16 portraits of famous Italian artists, assembled to grieve at the bedside of the dying painter, including Pierin del Vago, La Fornarina, Giulio Romano, Andrea Navagero, Cardinal Pietro Bembo, Ludovico Ariosto, Michelangelo, and Benvenuto Cellini.

He also painted a Miracle of St. Anthony of Padua and a Saints Simon Stock and Anthony of Padua for a church in Trieste; a Raphael and the Fornarina for the Tosi Gallery, Venice; a Cupid for the Brera Gallery in Milan; a Christ bearing the Cross; a Christ Asleep; a Torquato Tasso reading to Eleonora; a Repose in Egypt (1824); a Venus and Cupid (1832); a Madonna (1854); a Raphael painting the Fornarina (1861); and a Holy Family (1864).

His wife, Regina Sfriza, died soon after Felice. His daughters Carolina and Julia were also painters, the former of landscapes, the latter of history and portraits. His brother Giovanni was also a painter of mythology and history.
