= Zuccari (surname) =

Zuccari is an Italian surname. Notable people with the name include:

- the surname (which is also stated as Zuccaro) of a family of notable Italian painters active in the 16th and 17th centuries :
  - Ottaviano de Zucharellis and his sons
    - Taddeo Zuccari (1529-1566) and
    - Federico Zuccari (c. 1540-1609);
- Anna Radius Zuccari (1846–1918), Italian writer
- Carlo Zuccari (1703-1792), Italian composer and violist
- Federigo Zuccari (1783 –1817), Italian astronomer

== See also ==
- Zuccari (disambiguation)
- Zuccaro
