= Alexandru Hrisoverghi =

Poet

- Born: February 27, 1811; Iași
- Died: March 9, 1837 (aged 26); Iași
- Occupations: poet, translator, soldier
- Writing career
- Period: 1834–1837
- Genre: lyric poetry
- Literary movement: Romanticism

Alexandru Hrisoverghi (February 27, 1811 – March 9, 1837) was a Moldavian Romanian-language poet and translator, whose work was influenced by Romanticism. The author of few lyrical works, he was foremost noted for his association with political and intellectual figures such as Mihail Kogălniceanu, Costache Negruzzi, Vasile Cârlova, and Grigore Crupenschi.

== Biography ==
Born in Iași, Hrisoverghi was a member of the boyar category: the second of Vornic Neculai Hrisoverghi's four sons, he traced his origin to Greek Phanariotes who were present in Moldavia during the rule of Prince Dimitrie Cantemir. His mother was Elena Ruset, a member of the Rosetti family. According to his friend and biographer Mihail Kogălniceanu, "Hrisoverghi took absolutely no pride in this vain noble origin; he had sufficient personal merit, without needing any more from his parents". Neculai Hrisoverghi died in 1818.

Alexandru Hrisoverghi's childhood and youth coincided with the Greek War of Independence, during which the Filiki Eteria troops of Alexander Ypsilantis occupied Moldavia and Wallachia; the Hrisoverghis took refuge in Imperial Russian-ruled Bessarabia. It was in Chișinău that he began his studies, being tutored in Ancient Greek by a teacher named Constantin, before returning to his native city in 1824. After attending the Orthodox school in Iași, he enrolled in a French-language boarding school headed by a professor Mouton, while being tutored in Ancient Greek literature by a Greek teacher named Franguli. According to Kogălniceanu: "His education was superficial; but this was no fault of his, rather that of a lack in educational institutions that was being experienced in Moldavia at the time".

As a consequence of the Russo-Turkish War of 1828–1829, Moldavia and Wallachia were occupied by Russia, and, soon after, became subject to the Regulamentul Organic regime. This notably provided for the creation of a Moldavian Militia force, which young people of the principality joined in large numbers after 1830. Hrisoverghi was one of them, but withdrew in 1832, after just two years of service—dissatisfied with military life, he was also the sole provider for his family after two of his brothers had died. At the time, he became an avid reader of André Chénier and other French Romantics, while leading a Bohemian lifestyle and becoming noted for his affairs with women. Reportedly, he was a handsome person, and the object of compliments from women in high society.

By that time, Hrisoverghi was showing the symptoms of an unknown disease, which first manifested itself as renal colics. As doctors recommended exercise and fresh air, he left for the Ottoman Empire, visiting Rumelia on his way to Edirne. In Kogălniceanu's view: "The patriarchal life of the Bulgarians, their customs so unlike those of any other, more civilized and thus more commonplace, nations, the magnificent view of the Balkans still full of souvenirs from the Russian victories [in the war of 1828-1829], all that primitive nature left vivid imprints in his memory and awoke within him the poetic genius".

Returning to Moldavia in 1834, Alexandru Hrisoverghi published his debut work, Ruinelor Cetății Neamțu or Oda ruinelor Cetății Neamțu, an ode which had been prompted by news that the inhabitants of Târgu Neamț were planning to raze the nearby medieval complex and use it as a source of building material (see Neamţ Fortress). Its final stanza began with the words:

O, fraților moldoveni, bătrâni, tineri, de-a valmă,
Veacurilor viitoare nu gândiți că-i să dați samă?
Și puteți cu sânge răce privi ace daramare?
Nu opriți barbara faptă, nu-nălțați toți o strigare?
Priviți marturul ce unul din veacuri ne rămăsese,
Că neamul nostru din neamuri de viteji se alesăse,
Cum îl darămă și-l strică lăcomia-n sumețire,
și își face ei palaturi, spre a-și găsi mulțămire.

Translation:

O, Moldavian brethren, old and young alike,
Don't you think that you'll be called to answer in future eras?
And will you, in cold blood, witness that demolition?
Will you not stop that Barbaric deed, will you not raise your voices?
Gaze upon the sole witness left to us from another age,
For your nation is successor to nations of braves,
How the gluttony ruins and spoils it into ostentation,
For it to build palaces for itself, in order to gain satisfaction.

Ruinelor Cetății Neamțu had instant appeal, persuading Prince Mihail Sturdza to block the Târgu Neamț demolition projects, as well as popularizing historic preservation throughout Moldavia.

Over the following years, Hrisoverghi pursued a romantic affair with Catinca Beldiman, the wife of Vornic Nicolae Dimachi (himself an amateur poet). According to Kogălniceanu (who did not mention her name): "She was a young, beautiful woman, with a vivid imagination, who had kept alive all the illusions of her childhood and who, resonating with the young poet's fiery words, answered him: love me, be blessed; make yourself a luminous name among men, so you may cover me with your glory. Hrisoverghi found in her the ideal heroine he had previously read about in works by Byron, Dumas and those of so many novelists; he gained a soul to understand his own soul, a heart for his heart, a star for his horizon. He thus forgot everything else, glory, honors, future, in order to live for his loved one". Kogălniceanu noted that all of Hrisoverghi's works after that moment, his poems as well as his translation of Dumas' Antony, evidenced the inspiration Hrisoverghi had received from the object of his affection. Antony was first published posthumously by the Bucharest printing press of Ion Heliade Rădulescu, and featured a preface by Costache Negruzzi.

Also in 1834, Hrisoverghi welcomed the arrival of Prince Mihail Sturdza, through which the Ottoman Empire consecrated the end of Phanariote rules, and authored a poem in Sturdza's honor (Oda pentru venirea î. s. domnului stăpânitor). After that moment, he also decided to regain the Militia (August 1834), serving as adjutant to the Hatman. In late December, Sturdza welcomed him on his personal staff, where he served as princely adjutant, being promoted Captain in January 1836.

In February, after he was present at a masquerade ball in Iași, he left on mission to Pribești, traveling through a blizzard—this contributed to the subsequent decline of his health. Physicians recommended that he seek help from Austrian specialized doctors in Vienna, who ultimately directed him to the thermal baths in the Two Sicilies, at Ischia. This treatment failed to improve his condition, and, following his return to Moldavia, Hrisoverghi never left his bed. In constant pain for the following year, he died soon after turning 26, and was buried at the Sfântul Nicolae din Deal Church in Iași. His funeral was attended by a large group of officers and young civilians. The autopsy reportedly uncovered that Hrisoverghi died of complications from tabes dorsalis, which medicine of the time attributed to tuberculosis.

In connection to his death, Gheorghe Sion later claimed that Hrisoverghi was severely injured after jumping from a window, when caught in his lover's arms by her husband; allegedly, his rival took him into his care. This account, which probably referred to Catinca Beldiman and her husband, was doubted by George Călinescu, who noted that it may have been entirely borrowed from Antony.

A book of his collected works was published in 1843, and included his panegyrics to various potentates of his day. Most of his poems were left in unpolished stages, including one he composed on his deathbed:

Gata a lăsa viața, plâng, suspin nemângăiat,
A tristelor mele zile nădejdea s-a-mprăștiat.
C-o privire tânjitoare mi-e drag a mă mai uita
La fericirile lumii ce nu le-am putut gusta.

Translation:

Ready to part with life, I cry, I sob uncomforted,
The hope in my bitter days has scattered.
With a pining gaze I still lovingly look
To the world's joys I could not have tasted.

== Legacy ==
Kogălniceanu, who defined Hrisoverghi's views as "liberal and in balance with the times", noted the influence exercised by André Chénier on his style, and drew parallels between the two authors' lives (including their ambivalent attitudes toward military life). In addition, he credited the writer with having introduced a national focus in Moldavian literature, which, he claimed, lagged behind that of Wallachia in this respect (while acknowledging that Hrisoverghi's poems would occasionally rank below modern standards). The poet Vasile Alecsandri, whose career began soon after Hrisoverghi died, looked back on the period in an introduction to writings by his friend Negruzzi: "The development of ideas and the purifying of literary taste were very bitterly made aware of the government's oppressive system, and the impetus of writers broke off its wings, crashing into public indifference like one would into a rock. Old people would only read the lives of the saints; and youngsters would read nothing at all, holding Romanian books in contempt, and among those youngsters only an Alexandru Hrisoverghi and a Costache Negruzzi: rari nantes in gurgite vasto would tap their foreheads, saying, like Chénier in the hour of his death: Et pourtant je sens que j'ai quelque chose là ["And yet I feel that have something here"]!".

In later periods, literary critics took more reserved stands in respect to Hrisoverghi's contribution to Romanian literature. During the interwar period, Paul Zarifopol expressed disapproval of Hrisoverghi and many of his contemporaries (including Ienăchiță and Iancu Văcărescu, Vasile Cârlova, Gheorghe Asachi and Ion Heliade Rădulescu). While commending Kogălniceanu for establishing an influential school of literary criticism, he noted that the emphasis he had placed on "national specificity" had led him to overestimate the value of poets such as Hrisoverghi. Writing a decade later, George Călinescu noted that Ruinelor Cetății Neamțu was "a disgraceful replica of Cârlova's Ruinurile Târgoviștii". He also stressed the misogyny present in several lyrics authored by Hrisoverghi, which he defined as "[having] the stray impulses of Romantic jokes and featuring ridiculous invectives". In respect to this, he cited the stanza:

Te hlizești, nelegiuito, și îți bați chiar joc de mine,
Dar gândește că cuțitul poate fi și pentru tine.

Translation:

You giggle, you wicked woman, and you even mock me,
But consider that the knife can also be used on you.

Besides his translation of Dumas' novel, Alexandru Hrisoverghi is noted for those of poems by Chénier (to which he notably added his own verses), Friedrich Schiller (probably, through a French-language translation), Alphonse de Lamartine, and Victor Hugo. He is the main character in a 1943 novel by Theodor Rășcanu (Fermecătorul Hrisoverghi).
