= Albina Românească =

19th century Moldovan political and literary magazine

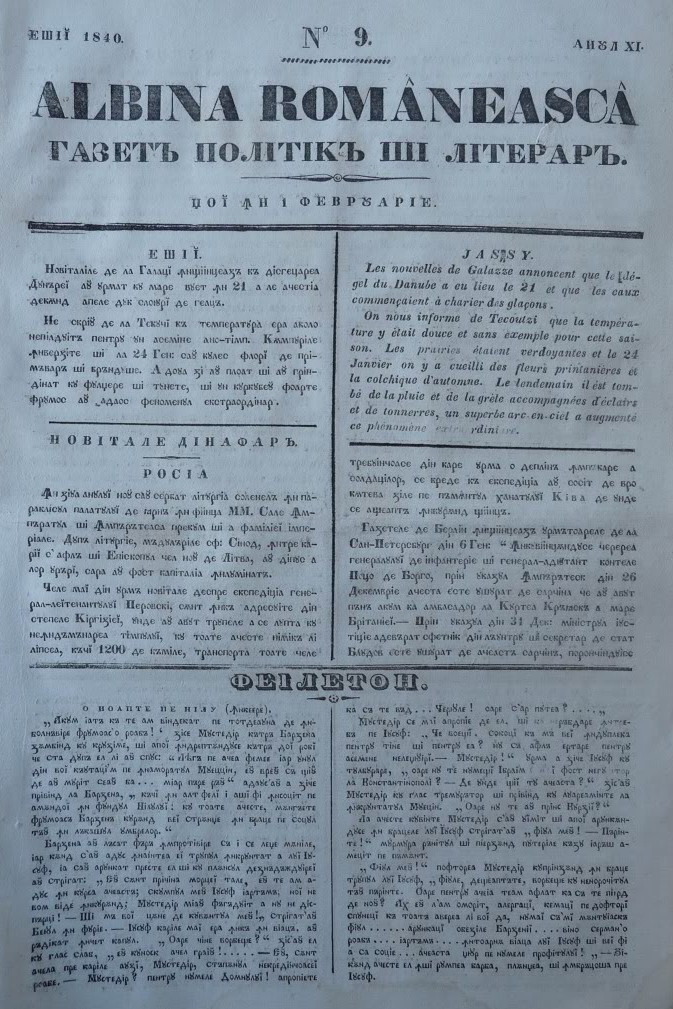
- Albina Românească issue no. 9, cover dated February 1, 1840
- Editor: Gheorghe Asachi
- Categories: political magazine, literary magazine
- Frequency: Bi-weekly
- First issue: June 1, 1829
- Final issue: 1850
- Country: Moldavia
- Language: Romanian

Albina Românească ("The Romanian Bee") was a Romanian-language bi-weekly political and literary magazine, printed in Iaşi, Moldavia, at two intervals during the Regulamentul Organic period (between June 1, 1829, and January 3, 1835, and again between January 3, 1837, and January 2, 1850). The owner and editor was Gheorghe Asachi. It published the literary supplement Alăuta Românească.

Albina Românească was the second journal to be published in its country, after the French-language Courrier de Moldavie, and the first Romanian-language one in Moldavia. Alongside Curierul Românesc, edited by Ion Heliade Rădulescu in Wallachia, and George Bariţiu's Gazeta de Transilvania, it was one of the main Romanian periodical presses of the time.

== See also ==
- List of magazines in Romania
