= Antonio Zuccaro =

Italian painter (1815–1892)

Antonio Zuccaro (1815–1892) was an Italian painter.

He was born in San Vito al Tagliamento, but was educated at the Accademia di Belle Arti of Venice, under Giuseppe Borsato and Ludovico Lipparini. He mainly worked in the Friuli, in Dalmatia, and Trieste. His topics, young seductive women, mirrored those of Natale Schiavoni. He died in Trieste.

He painted a portrait of a girl (1885), now on display in the Museo Civico Mospurgo in Trieste.
