= Edward Zuccaro =

American politician (1943–2025)

Member of the Vermont House of Representatives
- In office 1981–1989

Personal details
- Born: February 5, 1943; New York City, New York, U.S.
- Died: January 13, 2025 (aged 81); St. Johnsbury, Vermont, U.S.
- Political party: Republican
- Spouse: Carol Ann Bessette (m. 1967)
- Children: 2
- Parents: Edward Joseph Zuccaro (father); Malvina Broglio Zuccaro (mother)

Edward Richard Zuccaro (February 5, 1943 – January 13, 2025) was an American politician from the state of Vermont. He served as a Republican member of the Vermont House of Representatives.

== Life and career ==
Zuccaro was born in New York City on February 5, 1943, the son of Edward Joseph Zuccaro (1914–1989) and Malvina (née Broglio) Zuccaro (1916–2010). He grew up in Floral Park, New York, earned a B.S. in political science from the University of Vermont in 1964, and earned a J.D. from New York Law School in 1967. He married Carol Ann Bessette in 1967, and they had two children. He joined AROTC in college, and served in the U.S. Army for two years beginning in March 1968. In 1972, he co-founded a law firm, Zuccaro & Willis, where he would work until retiring in 2022. He represented St. Johnsbury, Vermont and several neighboring towns as town attorney for several decades.

In 1980, Zuccaro was elected to the Vermont House of Representatives. Following the 1982 elections, he challenged Robert Kinsey to be the Republican majority leader, but withdrew his candidacy, citing a desire to avoid party infighting. In January 1987, Zuccaro stood as the Republican candidate for speaker of the house, but he lost 63–87 to Democrat Ralph G. Wright despite Democrats holding a slimmer 76–74 majority. He retired from the house in the 1988 election.

Other positions Zuccaro filled included chairing the University of Vermont board of trustees, chairing the Vermont Judicial Nominating Board from 1986 to 1988, and sitting on the state's Professional Conduct Board for lawyers. He died at his St. Johnsbury home on January 13, 2025, at the age of 81, having battled prostate cancer for three years.
