= Jean Alexandre Vaillant =

Jean Alexandre Vaillant (French pronunciation: [ʒɑ̃ alɛksɑ̃dʁ vajɑ̃]; 1804 – 21 March 1886) was a French and Romanian teacher, political activist, historian, linguist and translator, who was noted for his activities in Wallachia and his support for the 1848 Wallachian Revolution. A Romantic nationalist and Freemason, he was an associate of the liberal faction in both Wallachia and Moldavia, as well as a collaborator of Ion Heliade Rădulescu, Ion Câmpineanu, Mitică Filipescu, and Mihail Kogălniceanu.

A tutor and later teacher at the Saint Sava School in Bucharest during the 1830s, he rose suspicions for his involvement in political conspiracies and was ultimately banned from Wallachia. Vaillant advocated the unification of the Danubian Principalities and other Romanian-inhabited areas, an ideal he notably expressed in his 1844 work La Romanie. Credited with having publicized the Romanian cause in his native country during the 1850s, and with having introduced the modern references to "Romania" in international discourse, he briefly returned to Bucharest and was naturalized by the new Romanian state in 1864. The state of the Roma community was another one of Vaillant's interests, and the practice of Roma slavery led him to express support for abolitionist goals.

== Career ==
=== Private tutor ===
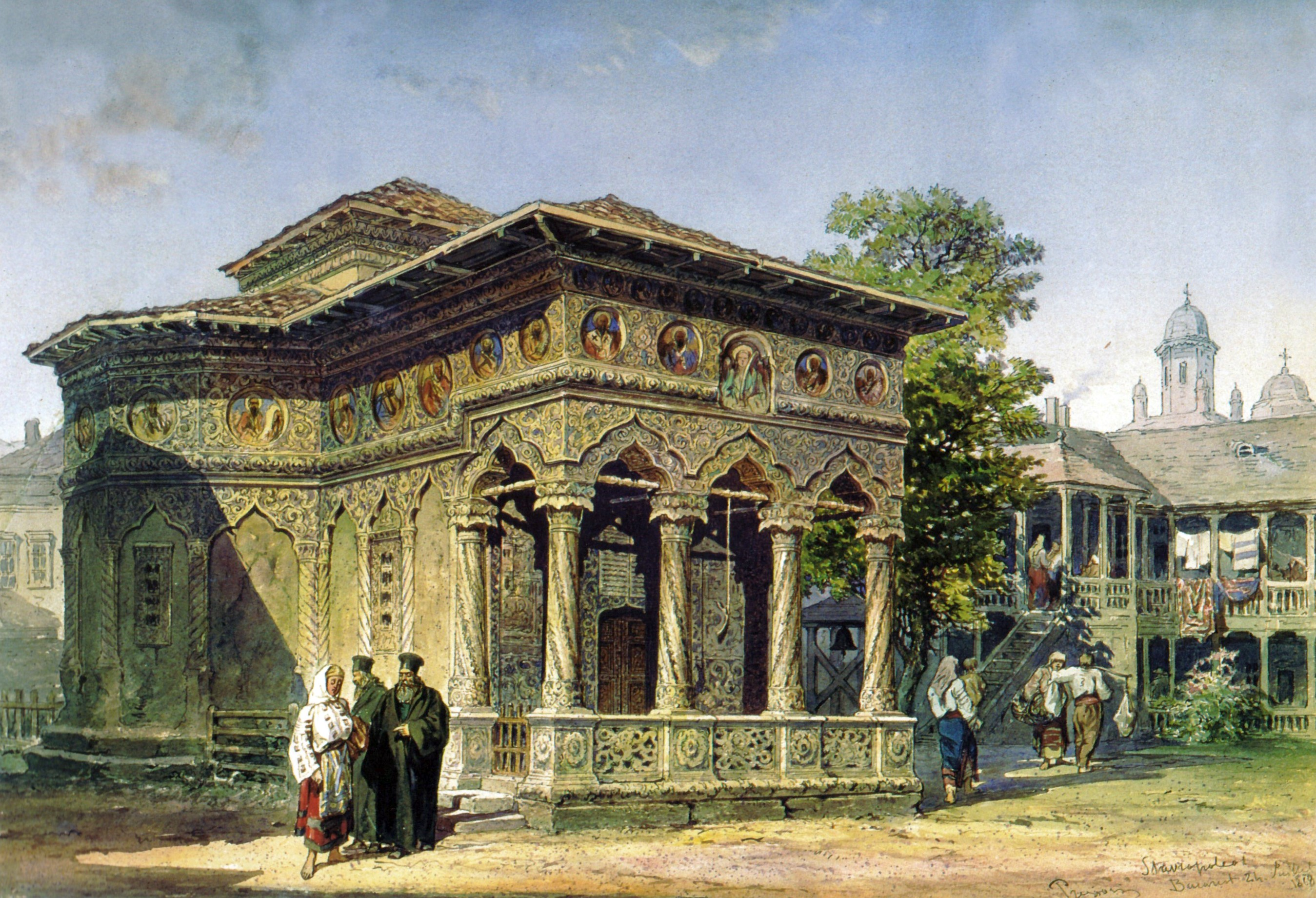
Stavropoleos Church in an 1868 watercolor by Amedeo Preziosi

Vaillant arrived in Bucharest on November 4, 1829, being first employed as a French language tutor by the Great Ban George Iordachi, a member of the Filipescu family of boyars. Joining a sizable community of French and other European expatriates, he was, according to historian Nicolae Iorga, "the only one [of them] whose literary activity was able serve the rapprochement between distant France and this Latin country on the Danube".

He terminated his contract in spring of the following year, and decided to open of school for boys aged 12 to 15; the initiative was publicized by Heliade Rădulescu's magazine Curierul Românesc. Vaillant's school was located in buildings owned by Serdar Popa, in the vicinity of Stavropoleos Monastery. Together with the similar activities of Félix Colson (who was tutoring young members of the Văcărescu family), and those of the Moldavian-based Cuénim and the abbé Lhommé, this brought an important step in the Westernization of Romanian society, while contributing to enforcing admiration for France among young boyars. It also signified a breaking point with education in Greek, which had been the norm before and during the Phanariote age (ever since the 17th century initiatives of Prince Matei Basarab). The memoirist Ion Ghica later noted that, among Vaillant's pupils, were scions of the Filipescu family, as well as those of the Grădişteanus, Bălăceanus, Rosettis, Golescus and his own family (the Ghicas). Another of his pupils was the future radical politician and historian Nicolae Bălcescu. Vaillant was also a teacher at a school for girls, which functioned without tuition.

=== Saint Sava professor ===
In 1832, he was appointed French-language teacher and head of the boarding house at the prestigious Saint Sava School, which he had been commissioned to modernize. This came upon the end of the Russo-Turkish War of 1828–1829, when Imperial Russian troops had taken over administration of Wallachia, without removing it from Ottoman tutelage. Vaillant was able to persuade the new authorities after authoring a poem in honor of Governor Pavel Kiselyov.

The high standards he endorsed earned him even more popularity, as well as a salary worth twice that of local staff. Nevertheless, his contract was terminated in 1833 or 1834. The reason for this is unclear: some sources have attributed it to Vaillant's advocacy of nationalist tenets in front of his students, which reportedly rose suspicions from Russia, who was overseeing administration of the country under the Regulamentul Organic regime; others still indicate that he was involved in a conflict with Inspector Petrache Poenaru (in turn, this clash was attributed to Valliant's activities as Freemason or to him having continued to teach privately, thus competing with his state employers).

Vaillant also published a concise textbook of Romanian language and grammar (1836), intended as a learning instrument for French people (Grammaire valaque à l'usage des français). It featured a glossary, as well as a historical overview and translations of poems (notably, Vasile Cârlova's Ruinurile Târgoviştii and Heliade Rădulescu's Visul). In the preface to this work, Vaillant stressed the Latin origin of the Romanian language (in relation to other Romance languages), and, elaborating, argued that "Wallachian is nothing less than a dialect of the Roumannesque language, a name which in itself serves to indicate its descent".

=== Conspiracies and return to Paris ===
By the late 1830s, Jean Alexandre Vaillant became involved with the liberal trend in opposition to the Regulamentul Organic regime, engaging in conflict with Prince Alexandru II Ghica. As such, he first associated with Ion Câmpineanu, who stood out in the Wallachian Assembly in opposition to Ghica's policies. According to Iorga, he was also sympathetic to the cause of other Balkan peoples in their conflict with the Ottoman Empire (including the rebellious activities of Bulgarian activists in Brăila and the plans devised by the former Prince of Serbia, Miloš Obrenović, who was residing in Bucharest at the time).

By that time, he was a noted figure in Wallachian Freemasonry, which reportedly owed inspiration to a conspiratorial system first applied by the Filiki Eteria during the early stages of the Greek Independence War; other people involved in this subversive movement were, among others, Câmpineanu, Heliade Rădulescu, Mitică Filipescu, Nicolae Bălcescu, Eftimie Murgu. After Câmpineanu was defeated, Vaillant rallied with a conspiracy formed around Filipescu; on November 18, 1840, as authorities clamped down on Filipescu's movement, he fled Bucharest, heading for the Moldavian capital of Iaşi. According to Iorga, Vaillant's involvement with the revolutionary milieu, and especially with Filipescu and Heliade Rădulescu, had made him the object of suspicion. It was in Iaşi that he became an associate of Kogălniceanu, after taking an interest in Moldavian chronicles which the latter was reviewing and publishing; later, it was proposed that Vaillant's 1844 volume, La Roumanie, featured sections of text actually contributed by the Moldavian writer. On June 19, 1841, the Wallachian Assembly voted to expel him indefinitely from the country for his role in Filipescu's revolutionary attempt.

Vaillant returned to Paris, where he continued publicizing his arguments in favor of Wallachian and Moldavian causes. On August 2, 1844, he spoke in front of the Société Orientale, of which he had been made a member, protesting against censorship imposed by Russia in the Danubian Principalities (he expanded on this perspective in La Roumanie). At the time, he became close to Édouard Drouyn de Lhuys, President of the Société Orientale, whose support for the cause of ethnic Romanians he consequently enlisted. He also contacted the poet Alphonse de Lamartine, who, in 1846, became head of Societatea Studenţilor Români (the Society of Romanian Students).

Vaillant continued to publish various works by Romanian writers, this time in the Revue de l'Orient — among its contributors were Vasile Alecsandri, Nicolae Bălcescu, Cezar Bolliac, Kogălniceanu, and Costache Negruzzi (the latter notably sent his novella Alexandru Lăpuşneanu). He would later publish a volume grouping several of Bolliac's works. Vaillant also welcomed Romanian students into any of three Parisian Lodges he had helped create: La Loge du Parfait Silence ("The Lodge of Perfect Silence"), La Loge de la Bonne Amitié ("The Lodge of Good Friendship"), and La Loge de l'Athénée des Étrangers ("The Lodge of the Atheneum of Foreigners").

=== Later activism and naturalization ===
After 1848, when the Wallachian Revolution ended in occupation by Ottoman and Russian troops, and until the Crimean War, Vaillant continued to print pamphlets supporting the Romanian cause. As Russian troops retreated, to be replaced by a provisional Austrian administration, in turn superseded by a protectorate of powers (including the French Empire), he issued text supporting a Moldo-Wallachian union and emphasizing the two countries' autonomy in respect to the Porte. In 1857, he authored an appeal to Count Colonna-Walewski, the French Foreign Minister, in which he called for "France's sympathies" in respect to "the Moldo-Wallachians", based on "their magnificent past and the hope of their future". At the time, he made several references to Romania as la langue d'or ("the golden language"), a name notably featured in the title of a Romanian literature collection he printed in 1851. Vaillant also wrote pieces criticizing Moldavian separatists.

The union he supported was accomplished in 1859, through the election of Alexandru Ioan Cuza as ruler of both countries. Three years later, Vaillant was back in Bucharest for a few months, giving free lectures on ancient history. He was naturalized Romanian in 1864, at the same time as his compatriots and fellow pro-Romanian activists Paul Bataillard and Jean Henri Abdolonyme Ubicini. In addition, Domnitor Cuza awarded him a pension worth 4,000 French francs.

Jean Alexandre Vaillant died in Paris 22 years later, and was buried with full honors at the expense of the Romanian Kingdom. The Romanian Legation, headed by its secretary George Bengescu, and other members of the Romanian community in the city accompanied the hearse. Bengescu spoke at the ceremony, referring to Vaillant as "a brother", he noted that he had been one of "the courageous and enthusiastic pioneers of the Romanian people's political and national regeneration".

== Views ==
=== La Romanie ===
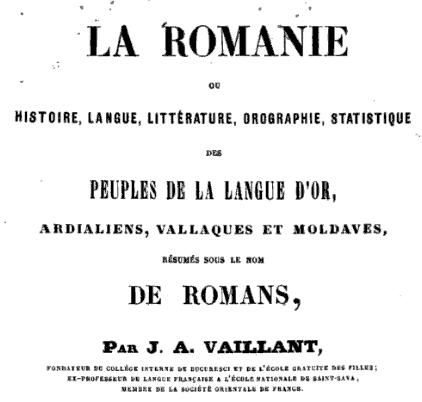
Front page of La Roumanie, 1844

Vaillant's 1844 La Romanie (in its long version, the title was given as La Roumanie, ou Histoire, langue, littérature, orogrphie, statistique des peuples de la langue d'or, Ardialiens, Vallaques et Moldaves, résumés sur le nom de Romans) was notably reviewed by Nicolae Iorga in his 1918 essay on French-Romanian relations). He noted that Vaillant extended the scope of his researches into Romanian history out of Wallachia and Moldavia, and into Austrian-ruled Transylvania: "He preoccupied himself [...], for the first time, with the Romanians in Transylvania, [a region] which he named, taking in view the national [Romanian] term serving to designate this enslaved land, Ardeal (Ardial), whence Ardialiens (in Romanian: Ardeleni)".

Iorga also concluded that Vaillant was among the first persons to use the terms "Romania" and "Romanian" in the modern sense, after they had been in circulation for some time as designations of Wallachia and its citizens (commonly known in Romanian as Ţara Românească, the latter principality had, Iorga contended, come to adopt the term România as self-reference by the time Vaillant was writing his essay). The names were subsequently adopted by Mihail Kogălniceanu, Vasile Alecsandri and other Romanian revolutionaries. The French versions of the names "Romania" and "Romanians", in the form supported by Vaillant, were to be Romanie and roma[i]n, both alluding to Ancient Rome — these were not received as neologisms, and the enduring names in became Roumanie and roumain, probably based on the Romanian folk references to rumân.

La Roumanie provided a detailed account of the region's history, highlighting Vaillant's arguments in various controversial aspects. It began with an account of Dacia and Roman Dacia, which detailed the impact of Romanization, as well as the eventual retreat of Imperial Roman administration to the south of the Danube under Aurelian by 270. Commenting at length on the origin of the Romanians, he stressed that the Roman colonists had stayed behind during the Migration Period. Arguing that these had come from a latifundia-dominated Italian Peninsula to Dacia "as if to an El Dorado", he elaborated that it was impossible for them to have forsaken their property and become nomads (as suggested by various other historians). Vaillant notably drew comparisons with the end of colonial rule over New France, as well as with Early Modern Romanian history (noting that, during the Russo-Turkish Wars and related incursions, while the boyars and other notabilities took refuge in various regions, "the proletarians did not follow suit").

Thus, he claimed, when Transylvania was taken over by the Hungarians in the 9th century, Romanians were the main presence in the area; he believed that the Hungarian-language name for Transylvania, Erdély, was borrowed from Romanian, and had its origins in the Latin name Jupiter (see Historical names of Transylvania). Vaillant also supported the view that Walachia had been established by Romanian Transylvanians who wanted to preserve their Eastern Orthodox faith in front of Roman Catholic pressures stemming in the Kingdom of Hungary — Iorga disagreed with this thesis, stressing his own (according to which Wallachia was created through the union of several local polities). Vaillant gave a summary of subsequent developments in Transylvanian history, making references to the Budai Nagy Antal Revolt, to the careers of John Hunyadi, his son Matthias Corvinus, and Nicolaus Olahus (viewing all three as Romanians, he erroneously argued that John was a native of Oltenia), and to the Transylvanian conquests of the Moldavian Prince Petru Rareş (who, he believed, had been assigned the Transylvanian throne by Sultan Suleiman the Magnificent).

The account he gave of Michael the Brave's rule, during which Wallachia, Transylvania, and Moldavia were first gathered under one rule, was to inspire his pupil Nicolae Bălcescu (who was to author an entire volume on this period, titled Românii supt Mihai-Voievod Viteazul). He attributed Michael's expedition in Transylvania to him having "seen his brothers treated like serfs by the Magyar conquerors and the Saxon foreigners", and deplored his "cowardly assassination" on the orders of the Imperial general Giorgio Basta. He notably attributed the policy failures of Wallachian Prince Radu Şerban to Imperial opposition, claiming that he could have otherwise reestablished Michael's domain.

In reference to the 18th and early 19th centuries, Vaillant mentioned in passing the start of Habsburg rule in Transylvania, the Greek-Catholic conversions among Romanians in exchange for the unfulfilled promise of political rights, and the interest Moise Nicoară had taken in the French Revolution. Quoting George Bariţ, a major figure of the Transylvanian School, he noted that most Transylvanians were Romanian (1.2 million, as opposed to the 900,000 members of all other ethnicities), and recounted his own dissemination of unification ideals among Transylvanian expatriates in Wallachia.

In addition to these tenets, La Roumanie provided details on the history of Bucharest during the 1830s, including the number and type of wagons and carriages (70 hansom cabs, 1,775 phaetons and 7,502 wagons), and that of inns and hotels (he calculated that there were 20 of each).

=== On Roma slavery ===
Vaillant also authored a work on the history of the Romani people, to whom he referred as Romes or "the actual Bohémiens". Centered on the Roma community in Wallachia and Moldavia, the work was an investigation of slavery, to which Roma people were subjected in both lands. Making reference to the corvées required from peasants, Vaillant stressed: "if the peasant is a serf, the Gypsy is entirely a slave", while noting the prevalence of slavery among in Romanian society, the Orthodox Church included ("the state sells them, the private entrepreneurs buy them, and the monks also sit around with their palms exposed").

He noted that the institution relied on Roma settlement, indicating that most members of the ethnic group had abandoned their semi-nomadic lifestyle, commenting that the remaining few "do not pay taxes, but neither are they worth more than the wolves in the forest to their country". Reflecting on the status of slaves involved in manual labor, he provided an indignant account of the way in which they were chained. Vaillant's abolitionist views were probably an influence on his students, and arguably contributed to the proclamation ending slavery that was issued during the Wallachian Revolution of 1848.

== Selected works ==
- Grammaire valaque à l'usage des français ("Wallachian Grammar for French People"), 1836
- Grammaire roumaine ("Romanian Grammar"), 1840
- Vocabulaire roumain-français et français-roumain ("Romanian-French and French-Romanian Vocabulary"), 1840
- La Roumanie, ou Histoire, langue, littérature, orographie, statistique des peuples de la langue d'or, Ardialiens, Vallaques et Moldaves, résumés sur le nom de Romans ("Romania, or The History, Language, Literature, Orography, Statistics of the People with a Golden Language, Ardialians, Wallachians and Moldavians, Concisely Referred to as Romans"), 1844
- Les Romes, histoire vraie des vrais Bohémiens ("The Rom, the Actual History of the Actual Bohemians"), 1857
