= Pantazi Ghica =

Wallachian, later Romanian politician and lawyer (1831 - 1882)

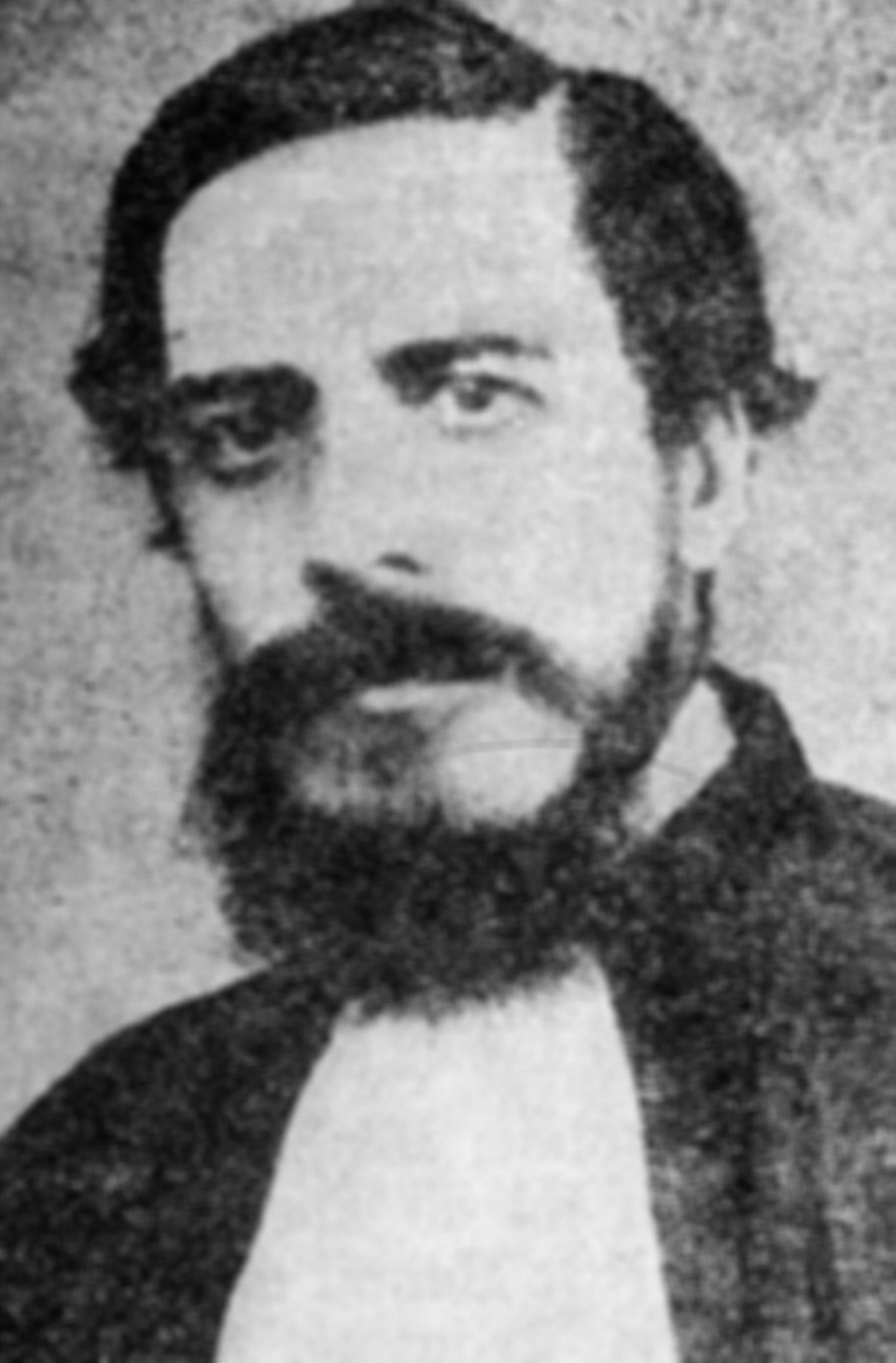
- Ghica, photographed in courtroom attire
- Born: March 15, 1831; Bucharest, Romania
- Died: July 17, 1882 (aged 51); Bucharest
- Occupations: journalist, dramatist, poet, short story writer, essayist, politician, lawyer
- Writing career
- Pen name: Tapazin, G. Pantazi, Ghaki
- Period: 1859–1882
- Genres: comedy, satire, memoir, drama, literary criticism
- Literary movement: Romanticism; Realism

Pantazi Ghica (Romanian pronunciation: [panˈtazi ˈɡika]; also known under the pen names Tapazin, G. Pantazi, and Ghaki; 15 March 1831 – 17 July 1882) was a Wallachian, later Romanian, politician and lawyer, also known as a dramatist, poet, short story writer, and literary critic. A prominent representative of the liberal current, he was the younger brother and lifelong collaborator of Ion Ghica, who served as Prime Minister of the Romanian Kingdom in 1866-1867 and again in 1870-1871. Pantazi Ghica began his political career as a participant in the Wallachian Revolution of 1848, a collaborator of the Romantic historian and activist Nicolae Bălcescu, and a member of the radical grouping headed by C. A. Rosetti. Although twice involved in the administration of Buzău County, Ghica lived much of his life in exile or in Bucharest, and was also a soldier for the Ottoman Empire during the Crimean War. After 1875, he was a prominent member of the National Liberal Party.

Generally seen as a mediocre writer, he was foremost noted for his associations with the literary figures Nicolae Filimon, Vasile Alecsandri, Dimitrie Bolintineanu, Alexandru Odobescu and Alexandru Macedonski, as well as for his extended polemic with the conservative literary society Junimea. Ghica's work and political convictions were criticized and often ridiculed by Junimist intellectuals such as Titu Maiorescu, Mihai Eminescu, and Ion Luca Caragiale. He is most likely one of the unnamed liberal politicians who are negatively portrayed in Eminescu's poem Scrisoarea a III-a.

Pantazi Ghica suffered from kyphosis. Notably, this physical defect is mentioned for satirical effect in Eminescu's poem and in Caragiale's autobiographical work, Din carnetul unui vechi sufleur.

== Biography ==
=== Early life and revolutionary activities ===
Pantazi was born into the Ghica family, a prestigious group of Phanariote hospodars and boyars in the Danubian Principalities, whose origins were Greek and Albanian. He was the twelfth of fifteen children born to Ban Dimitrie Ghica and his wife Maria Câmpineanu (a boyaress of the Câmpineanu family). Ion, Pantazi, Temistocle and Maria Ghica were the only four children to survive into adulthood.

Like his siblings, Pantazi Ghica studied at the Saint Sava College in Wallachia's capital. It was around that time that he befriended the poet Bolintineanu, who was twelve years his senior and by then already a friend of Ion Ghica. His mother later took him to France, where he is known to have been enlisted in a boarding house. Upon his return to Wallachia in 1847, together with his brother, Ghica was involved in the agitation leading up to the 1848 uprising, and became Bălcescu's secretary. Before the revolution toppled Prince Gheorghe Bibescu and created a new administration, Bălcescu sent Pantazi Ghica as an agitator, in service to the revolutionary organization Frăţia. Ghica was assigned the task of spreading propaganda in the counties of Buzău and Prahova. A common Russian-Ottoman intervention quelled the rebellion in autumn of the same year, to reestablish the Regulamentul Organic government. Both Ghica brothers, like most other revolutionaries, were arrested and exiled from Wallachia.

=== Exile ===
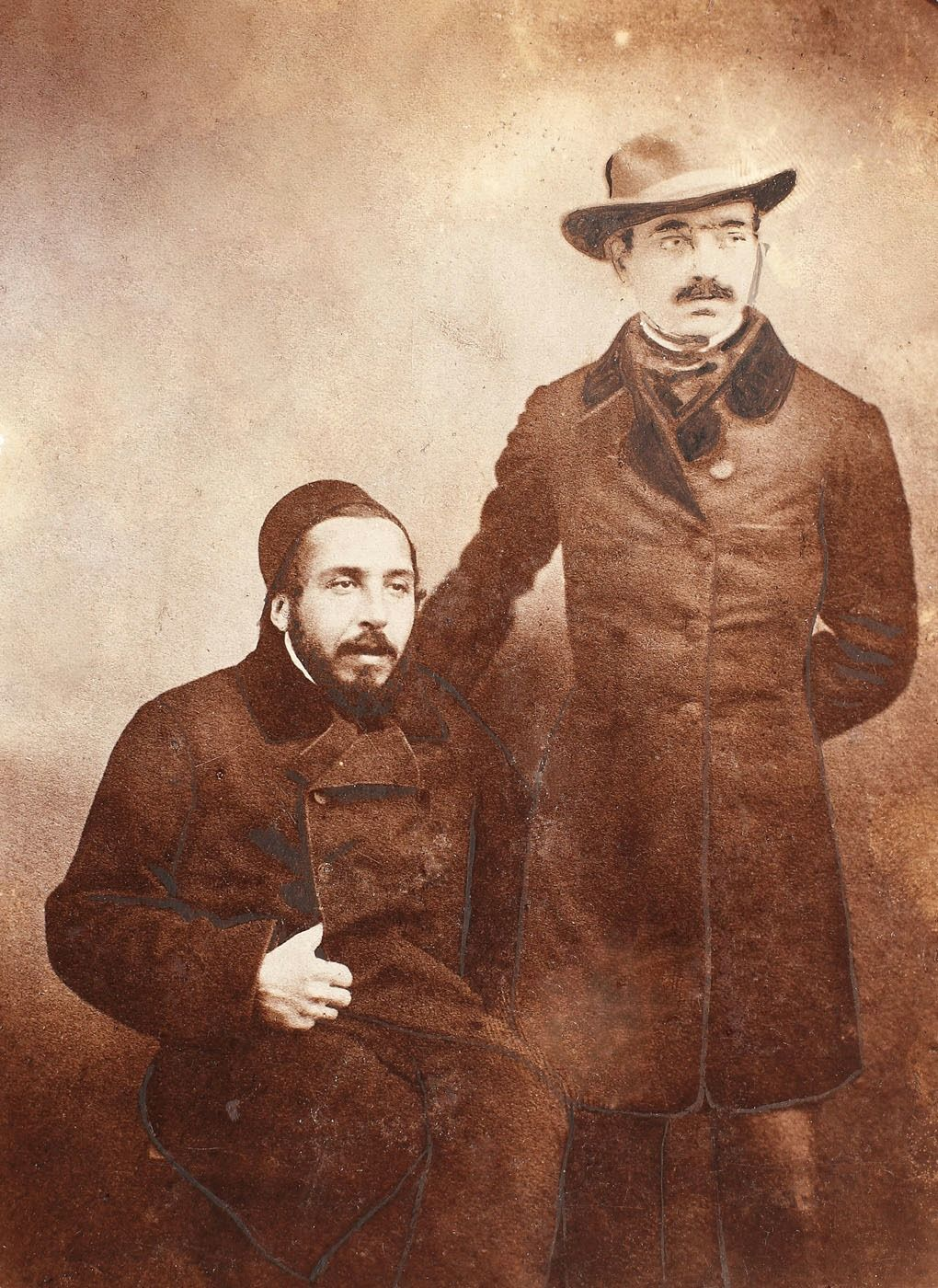
Ion Ghica (seated) and Vasile Alecsandri, photographed in Istanbul (1855)

The younger Ghica again settled in Paris, were his mother Maria was still residing. Following her death, he moved to Istanbul, joining his brother Ion (who was soon after offered protection by Sultan Abdülmecid I). Again in Paris by 1849, he became close friends with a group of Wallachian revolutionaries in exile, including D. Berindey, the physician Iatropolu, Alexandru Zissu and George Creţeanu; the five exiles signed a blood brotherhood pact.

Ghica attended high society meetings, and befriended a tenor at the Opéra National de Paris. He later claimed to have maintained close contacts with famous Parisian literary figures such as Alexandre Dumas and Alfred de Musset, and to have introduced them to Romanian culture—this was to be disputed by his Romanian adversaries, who noted that the account provided inaccurate details. Reportedly, he also associated with literary critic Jean-Baptiste Alphonse Karr, composers Daniel Auber and Fromental Halévy, and playwright Eugène Scribe. He probably studied for a while at the University of Paris' Law Faculty, but it is unclear whether he ever completed his education. His detractors later claimed that Pantazi Ghica had spent more time in the debtors' prison than among students, while Ion Ghica is known to have objected to his brother's lifestyle and to have asked Bălcescu to supervise him.

Around 1850, he fell in love with Camila de Fernex, who was related to the family of his French host, Aimé Guyet de Fernex. They were married in March 1852, when the Catholic Camila obtained a matrimonial dispensation from Marie-Dominique-Auguste Sibour, the Archbishop of Paris. Records of the events show that the matter of his marriage was only settled at the end of a long debate: the Romanian Orthodox Ghica had initially consented to have his children baptized Catholic, and then retracted his statement, leaving Archbishop Sibour to consent after obtaining a less compelling verbal agreement from him. The wedding ceremony took place at a Greek Orthodox church in Marseille.

The brothers Ghica returned to Bucharest separately during the late 1850s. Their arrival coincided with the outbreak of the Crimean War: Pantazi Ghica joined the Ottoman Army, serving as a Yüzbaşı in the Cossack Corps (part of the Imperial Guard). Decorated and promoted, he was again present in Bucharest as Russia was defeated and the Treaty of Paris allowed Wallachia to decide a new administration. Ion Ghica, who was promoted Bey of Samos Island in 1854, unsuccessfully applied for the office of Wallachian Prince during 1858, and later rose to ministerial offices.

=== Prosecutor, lawyer and journalist ===
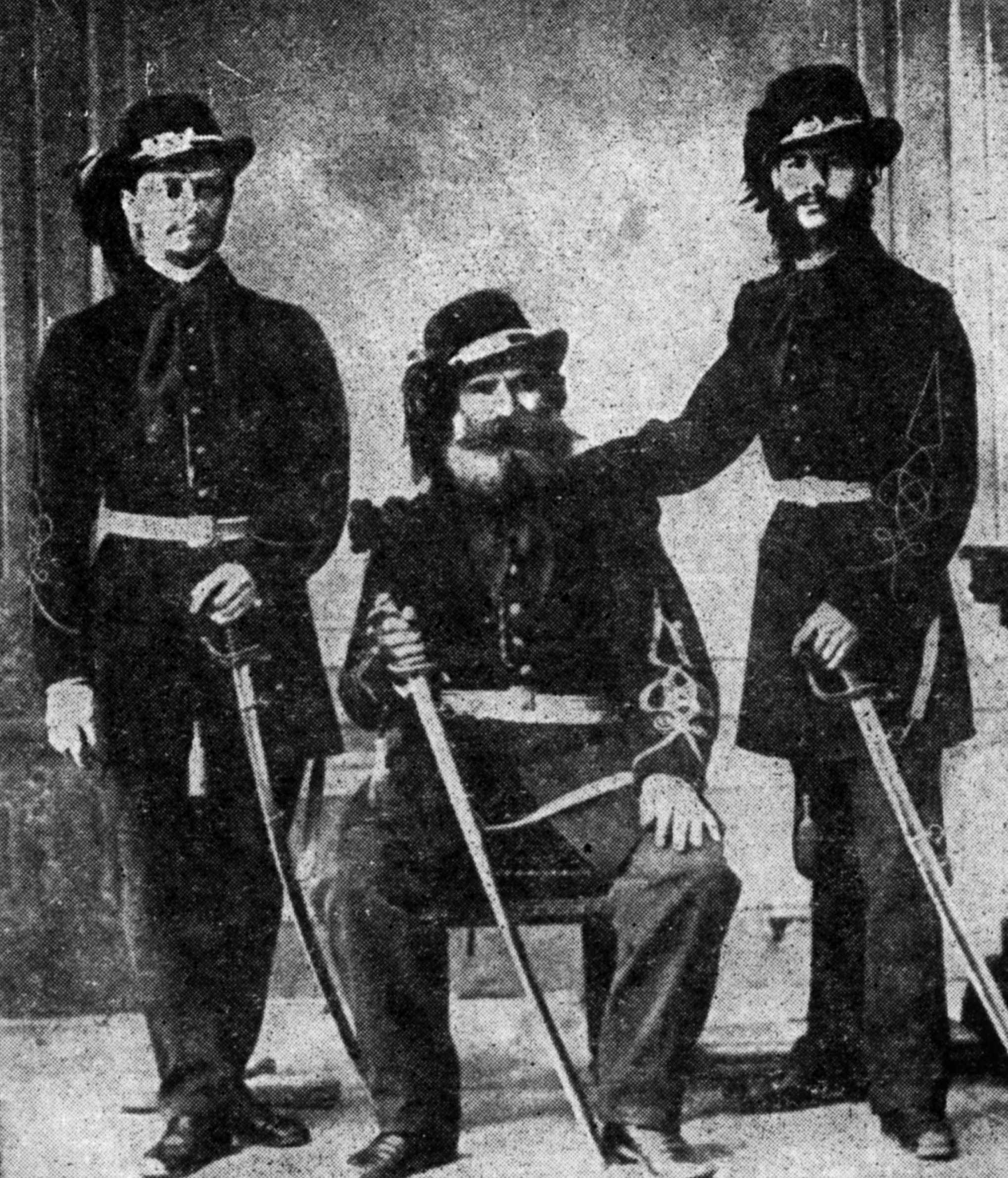
Members of the Citizens' Guard in Bucharest, 1866

In 1856-1858, he was a prosecutor in Dâmbovița County, before starting a private practice as a lawyer on Bucharest's Podul Mogoșoaiei. Pantazi Ghica subsequently became one of the main liberal activists, and rallied with its most radical wing, that headed by Rosetti. This came at a time when Wallachia's united with Moldavia under the rule of Alexandru Ioan Cuza (proclaimed in 1859, and effected in 1862). Following Cuza's election in both countries, Ghica joined the civil service: he first replaced his friend George Crețeanu as inspector in the Ministry of Justice (April–September 1859) and department head in the Ministry of Foreign Affairs (before 1860). He returned to his practice, and, in 1861, was a legal representative for people arrested during the anti-unionist riots in Craiova. In 1862, he was appointed attorney for the Ministry of Education.

In 1859, Pantazi Ghica joined Dimitrie Bolintineanu in editing the journal Dâmbovița, but, just a year later, his articles were the subject of a scandal, and he was arrested for allegedly breaking the ethics of journalism. He shared a cell with his colleague, N. T. Orășanu, a noted adversary of Carol's rule. He was also an associate of the writer Alexandru Odobescu, and, after 1861, collaborated on his monthly literary magazine Revista Română. It was here that he published a critical review of Ciocoii vechi și noi, a novel by his friend Nicolae Filimon, which upset the latter (as a consequence, relations between the two soured). For a while during those years, Ghica edited two satirical magazine, Păcală (named in honor of the eponymous folk hero) and Scrânciobul.

In 1863, he went on a trip to Moldavia, where he notably visited his relative Cleopatra Ghica (married into the Russian Trubetskoy family). He was again involved in a trial for calumny, but he was able to prove that the incriminated article was not his. Ghica also took interest in the activities of Iacob Negruzzi, a Moldavian-born writer who arrived in Bucharest around 1865—it was Ghica who introduced Negruzzi to the Rosetti circle. By the 1870s, he was also contributing articles to Rosetti's journal Românul. During the same period, he began publishing his literary pieces in Revista Contimporană.

In 1866, Domnitor Cuza was replaced with Carol of Hohenzollern. Apparently, Pantazi Ghica had played a secondary part in the conspiracy that toppled Cuza, as a local commander of the Citizens' Guard. Ghica was subsequently assigned the office of Buzău County prefect by the first of his brother's cabinets. The appointment was welcomed by Vasile Alecsandri, who was keeping a detailed correspondence with both brothers. However, his time in office was cut short, allegedly because he came to be disliked by Carol. He returned to the capital, where he purchased a villa on Cometei Street (the present-day Căderea Bastiliei Street), nearby Piața Romană. For a second time in eight years, he was exposed to public scrutiny for having failed to honor his debts: in 1868, his possessions in Buzău were sequestrated. Late in the year, he was Alecsandri's representative during a legal conflict with the peasants residing on his domain (after winning the trial, Alecsandri reciprocated by introducing Ghica to his friend, Minister of the Interior Mihail Kogălniceanu).

=== Final years ===
His new Bucharest residence became a meeting spot for literary figures. Ghica notably associated with the much younger Symbolist poet Alexandru Macedonski, who was also his neighbor. In 1875, Pantazi Ghica was witness to a scandal involving the Romanian Army and Ioan Emanoil Florescu, the Minister of War. That year, the officer Ioan Crainic, who considered himself insulted by Florescu, handed in his resignation from the military and challenged the Minister to a duel (asking Ghica to serve as both his courier and witness); the problems were eventually avoided after Florescu ordered his subordinates to arrest Crainic. At the time, Macedonski engaged in liberal politics, and, in 1876, co-founded the short-lived newspaper Stindardul, alongside Ghica, Bonifaciu Florescu, and George Fălcoianu. The publication was inspired by the renowned journalist Nicolae Moret Blaremberg. Later, Ghica also published essays in Macedonski's newly founded and more prestigious magazine, Literatorul.

He was for long a member of the Chamber of Deputies and the Senate, representing the "Red" liberal tendency and, late in life, the National Liberals. In June 1876, shortly after the first concentrated National Liberal cabinet came to power, he and Nicolae Fleva spearheaded the effort to prosecute the former "White" Conservative ministers. In opening the case, Ghica stated: "It wasn't just us who condemned those ministers, but public opinion in general, the entire country, cast a blame on them, and we are the expression of that blame". The effort pitted Pantazi Ghica against his main literary rival, outgoing Education Minister Titu Maiorescu, who was called in for questioning. The attempt to stage a trial was ultimately defeated by moderates in Ghica's own party, who ignored his vocal protests.

In June 1881, promoting the designs of one Traian Theodorescu, Pantazi Ghica unsuccessfully presented Parliament with a proposal to have a submarine built for the Romanian Navy. During the same year, he was a cabinet-appointed inspector of historical monuments in Moldavia. In spring of 1882, shortly before his death, Ghica, like many of his fellow National Liberals, spoke out against I. Filibiliu, a teacher at the Matei Basarab High School who had administered a mild form of corporal punishment to one of his pupils.

Pantazi Ghica died at his house on Cometei Street, and was buried at his family's estate in Ghergani. Camila Ghica survived him by 21 years: reportedly afflicted by dementia in old age, she died in 1908, at the age of 80.

== In culture ==
=== Works ===
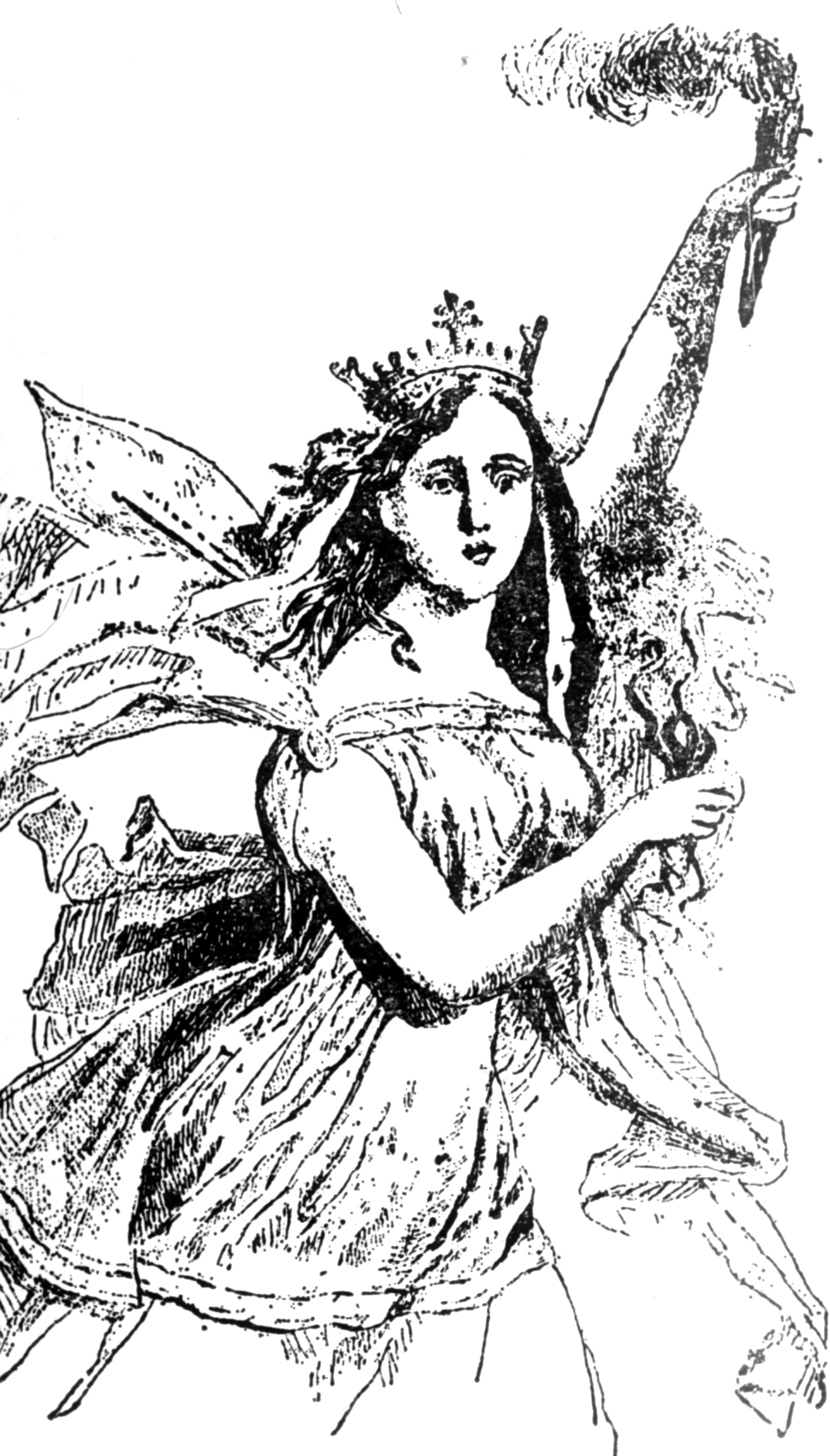
Wallachian Romantic aesthetics in an illustration to Nemesis, one of Dimitrie Bolintineanu's poems

Ghica published the first of his many Romantic novellas by the 1860s, when he collaborated on Odobescu's magazine. Literary critic Tudor Vianu noted that some of his works had a strong connection with Bohemianism, while others are thought to be influenced by the Romantic author Dimitrie Bolintineanu. With time, however, Ghica moved away from Romanticism, and developed his own brand of Realism, which did not exclude imagination and speculation, and which hailed Alecsandri as a prime example of writing. He was also opposed to Macedonski's notion of "sublime absurdity", arguing that the definitive criterion for creating poetic imagery was significance, and proposing elements of didacticism to feature in every work. In one instance, he argued that beauty "must absolutely be united with the good".

Ghica's work of hidden memoirs, the novella Un boem român ("A Romanian Bohemian"), was a tale of adventure and unrequited love: its main character, Paul, whose adventures mirror many in Ghica's life, elopes with a married woman, only to find that she is not faithful to him either. The plot is probably the first one in Romanian literature to discuss the topic of free love. In 1850, Ghica authored a piece in honor of the deceased poet Vasile Cârlova, titled O lacrimă a poetului Cârlova ("One of Poet Cârlova's Tears"). It depicted Cârlova drinking from a skull-shaped cup with the inscription Lina, adu-ţi aminte! ("Lina, remember!", allegedly in honor of a nun he had loved).

In addition, Pantazi Ghica wrote a lengthy satire the high society in his day (Schiţe din societatea română, "Sketches of the Romanian Society"), and, as a result of the Russo-Turkish War of 1877–1878, the play Răniţii români ("The Wounded Romanians"). Ghica was outraged to find that the National Theater did not accept his play, and, as a consequence, issued a formal protest. He contributed several romantic comedies, including, among others, Iadeş ("Wishbone") and Sterian Păţitul (roughly, "Sterian Who Has Learned"). He is also the most likely author of a piece sometimes attributed to his brother, in which the author explores the literary legacy of Don Juan.

=== Beţia de cuvinte ===
By the close of the 1860s, Pantazi Ghica was among the main targets of early criticism from Junimea—a literary society which expressed a conservative vision and was opposed to the cultural and political tenets of liberalism. Ghica's works were among those discussed by Junimea's Titu Maiorescu in his famous essay of 1873, Beţia de cuvinte. The title, meaning literally "inebriation with words", attacked Romantic liberals over their experiments with Romanian language, their Romantic nationalist aesthetic guidelines, and their emphatic prose. The influential Maiorescu saw these as a main source for the widespread cultural and social problems facing Romania during its process of Westernization.

Thus, Revista Contimporană contributors such as Ghica, V. A. Urechia, August Treboniu Laurian, and Gheorghe Sion are listed by Maiorescu as negative examples in Romanian literature, for their use of coined neologisms, as well as for their tautologies and contradictions. Maiorescu sarcastically recorded that Ghica was introducing new words to the Romanian lexis, through the means of Francization. Among other samples, the author used as illustrations several fragments from Pantazi Ghica's novella Marele vistier Cândescu ("The Great Treasurer Cândescu"). He noted the implicit tautology in Ghica's term silenţiu lugubru ("lugubrious silence"), pointing out that the first word covered the meaning of "silent" (thus leaving the notion to be read "silent silence"). A more complex one, listing several synonyms on end, read:

"[...] all left in silence but their faces showed the same pain, the same exasperation, the same desperation."

Pantazi Ghica, Urechia, Dimitrie August Laurian and Petru Grădişteanu decided to issue a common reply to Maiorescu's accusations, using Românul as their venue. The Junimist intellectual believed that their answer was an ignoratio elenchi, and dismissed their defense as "beside the point" (nu e la chestie). On the occasion, he also presented Ghica with more of his own mistakes.

Although not a Junimist, Odobescu himself agreed with such views, and pointed out further inexactitudes in the works of Pantazi Ghica—these comments are featured in a chapter of his major book, the Pseudo-cynegetikos, in its revised edition of 1887. Odobescu recorded the polemic between Ghica and the contributors to Junimea's magazine Convorbiri Literare—the former stood accused of having embellished his own biography by claiming to have won the interest of French writers during his stay in Paris. Odobescu hinted that he agreed with this assessment, stressing that Alexandre Dumas and Alfred de Musset had since died, and thus could not confirm that Pantazi Ghica had befriended them. He also noted, like the Junimists, that the chronological order indicated by Ghica was spurious. The latter argument referred to Ghica's statement that, in 1852, Dumas and de Musset had listened to his rendition of Vasile Alecsandri's poem Înşiră-te Mărgărite, which had in fact been completed in 1856, and first made available for the public four years later.

Ghica was unnerved by Maiorescu's reaction to his work, and verbally attacked the younger literary critic in several contexts spanning his career. This was the case in 1878, when both of them stood in the Chamber for opposite camps, and when Ghica heckled Maiorescu, who was giving a speech. On one occasion, Pantazi Ghica depicted Maiorescu as "a sort of a literary trickster", and himself claimed that his adversary was "at odds with grammar". Elsewhere, he claimed that Maiorescu's style "entirely lacks the conditions of serious criticism". With time, the conflict between Ghica and Convorbiri Literare degenerated into open hostility. Thus, in an unsigned piece of 1875, the magazine claimed to translate Victor Hugo's Chansons des rues et des bois: instead of the hunchback Mayeux, whom Hugo had placed at the end of a cortege grouping all animals, the Convorbiri Literare version had introduced "Pantazi" and adapted the rhyme accordingly.

Maiorescu's verdicts on Pantazi Ghica were shared by more modern Romanian critics. Tudor Vianu called Ghica "prolific, but not gifted". Elsewhere, he backed Ghica's inclusion among the "victims of Inebriation with words [italics in the original]", as well as Maiorescu's criticism of his Francized speech. Vianu's generation colleague George Călinescu defined Pantazi Ghica as "untalented" (although he acknowledged his "vast literary culture"), while Ştefan Cazimir likened his writings for the stage to what he believed was Ion Luca Caragiale's worst play, the melodrama O soacră. Călinescu referred to Marele vistier Cândescu as featuring "annoying neologisms" and "the lack of any intuition, no matter how modest, for historical color." Two exceptions among commentators were Gheorghe Adamescu, who valued several of Ghica's works (including his 1850 piece about Vasile Cârlova), and Ştefan Sihleanu, who credited Ghica with having single-handedly introduced Alessandro Manzoni's type of historical novels to local literature, in their adapted novella form.

=== Ghica's politics and the Junimists ===
The conservative groupings were especially critical of Pantazi Ghica's politics. Iacob Negruzzi, who eventually rallied with the Junimists, resented Rosetti's radical circle, and left an unflattering memoir of its meetings. Several other writers who associated with Junimea attacked the two brothers Ghica for their alleged corruption and demagogy. In Mihai Eminescu's lengthy poem Scrisoarea a III-a, an entire section elaborates a virulent anti-liberal discourse. Of it, a group of lyrics are believed to refer to Pantazi Ghica (identified by his appearance and his kyphosis) or, alternatively, to a composite portrayal of the two brothers. They read:

Vezi colo pe uriciunea fără suflet, fără cuget,
Cu privirea-mpăroşată şi la fălci umflat şi buget,
Negru, cocoşat şi lacom, un izvor de şiretlicuri,
La tovarăşii săi spune veninoasele-i nimicuri;
Toţi pe buze-având virtute, iar în ei monedă calpă,
Quintesenţă de mizerii de la creştet până-n talpă.

Translation:

See down there the soulless, thoughtless fright,
With his eyebrow-covered sight and his jaws all swollen and bloated,
Black-faced, hunchbacked and greedy, the source of ruses,
To his comrades he recounts his venomous trifles;
All of them having virtue on their lips, and within them forged currency,
A quintessence of filth from tip to toe.

Eminescu followed Ghica's political career with interest. In one of his articles for the Conservative journal Timpul, published in early 1882, he examined the Filibiliu affair, he took the teacher's side, arguing that both Ghica and Filibiliu's other National Liberal detractor, Petru Grădişteanu, were exaggerating. He commented that the scandal was largely owed to the victim's father having made use of his political connections with the Ion Brătianu cabinet, and protested when the teacher assigned a provincial post as a punitive measure. This was one of several polemics between Eminescu and various associates of Rosetti: literary historian Perpessicius argued that they were partly responsible for the "super-tensed" relations between Românul and Timpul. George Călinescu identified other, less-known, poems by Eminescu, which also allude to Ghica's style, politics and personal life.

The dramatist Ion Luca Caragiale, who wrote many of his works under the influence of Junimist principles, developed his own thesis on the political shortcomings of the liberal trend. As part of it, he argued that there was an essential difference between, on one hand, the major liberal figures of the 1848 revolution (Nicolae Bălcescu, Ion Câmpineanu and Ion Heliade Rădulescu) and, on the other, members of the National Liberal Party such as Pantazi Ghica, Nicolae Misail and Mihail Pătârlăgeanu. In his view, the latter group usurped the revolutionary legacy, while the former could have found itself best represented by the emerging Conservative Party.

=== Anecdotes ===
A socialite, Ghica was famed for his hectic lifestyle and his eclectic culture, which earned him the moniker Fantazaki (a pun on his two names, it originated in fantezie, the Romanian word for "fantasy") and the colloquial title of "king of the Romanian Bohemia". Among his recorded eccentricities were the contrast in his attitudes toward dogs and cats (a lover of the former, he despised the latter), and his refusal to travel anywhere except by coach. A rumor which probably made it into Eminescu's poetry had it that Pantazi Ghica, the alleged lover of famed and usually foreign actresses, sold tickets to their shows in front of coffee houses. Nonetheless, others knew him as a gentleman, praising him for his kindness and sociability.

At some stage in their lives, Pantazi Ghica and his friend C. A. Rosetti briefly associated with a circle of actors meeting in the house of theater manager Iorgu Caragiale (Ion Luca's uncle). Ion Luca Caragiale's 1907 work, Din carnetul unui vechi sufleur, featured an anecdote about Pantazi Ghica and Iorgu Caragiale, recounting how the former had fallen in love with an unnamed actress. According to the story, Ghica, who had asked the group of actors to facilitate an amorous meeting with the object of his affection, was the target of a prank: Iorgu Caragiale reportedly arranged for his colleague, a certain Matache Piţirigă, to dress up in female clothes and meet Ghica in an unlit room. The story went that the Pantazi Ghica caressed Piţirigă, causing the latter to become indignant and thus reveal his true identity. According to Ion Luca Caragiale, a shocked Pantazi Ghica ran out of the room and into the Fialcowsky coffee house. The amused reaction of the public surprised him, and he subsequently found that, in the dark, Piţirigă had smeared his face with soot. In its initial unpublished version, Din carnetul unui vechi sufleur simply described Iorgu Caragiale's victim as "a hunchback". Caragiale later added to his own text:

"...When, a couple of years back, I was adding the lines above to my notebook, the cheated young man was still alive; today he is dead—may God forgive all the lyrics and all the prose with which he has enriched our young literature, all the speeches he has held in succession in front of the two Chambers and during public meetings!—and since «one should only speak well of the dead», here is name pure and simple: Pantazi Ghica."

Another anecdote of the time had it that Pantazi Ghica was deeply resented by Domnitor Carol. According to the story, this was sparked by one of Carol's hunting trips in the vicinity of Buzău. Ghica, who was charged with organizing the event, allegedly thought he could gain more favor with the monarch by using a bear which, unbeknown to Carol, had been previously tamed by Romani trainers (see Ursari). Carol found out that this was the case, and, feeling insulted, ordered Pantazi Ghica to be relieved from his office of prefect. The short-lived magazine Satyrul once accused Ghica of having plagiarized for his Iadeş, and of having only added a dog as a character to separate his text from the source. As a result, a series of satirical lithographs, with Pantazi Ghica as their subject, showed a hunchback man in the company of a hunchback dog. Jokes about his medical condition even made it into the Chamber: a fellow deputy once made a public reference to Pantazi Ghica's arched spine, to which Ghica replied that it seemed arched because he only presented such colleagues with his back.

In 2010, researcher Radu Cernătescu proposed that Pantazi Ghica is the inspiration behind Gore Pirgu, the prototype social climber depicted in Craii de Curtea-Veche novel. The work, a Romanian classic, was written in the 1920s by Caragiale's estranged son Mateiu, and, Cernătescu notes, shows Ghica in company with decadent aristocrats from the Cantacuzino and Soutzos clans.
