= Ion Heliade Rădulescu =

Romanian writer and politician (1802–1872)

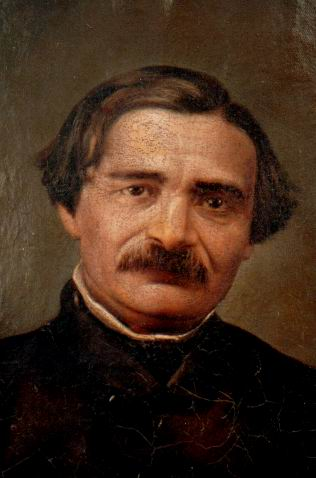
- Born: 6 January 1802; Târgoviște, Wallachia
- Died: 27 April 1872 (aged 70); Bucharest, Romania
- Occupations: poet; essayist; journalist; translator; historian; philosopher
- Writing career
- Pen name: Ion Heliade, Eliad
- Period: 1828–1870
- Genres: Lyric poetry; epic poetry; autobiography; satire
- Subjects: Linguistics; Romanian history; philosophy of history
- Literary movement: Romanticism; Classicism

Signature
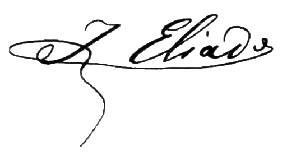

Ion Heliade Rădulescu or Ion Heliade (also known as Eliade or Eliade Rădulescu; Romanian pronunciation: [ˈi.on (h)eliˈade rəduˈlesku]; 6 January 1802 – 27 April 1872) was a Wallachian, later Romanian academic, Romantic and Classicist poet, essayist, memoirist, short story writer, newspaper editor and politician. A prolific translator of foreign literature into Romanian, he was also the author of books on linguistics and history. For much of his life, Heliade Rădulescu was a teacher at Saint Sava College in Bucharest, which he helped reopen. He was a founding member and first president of the Romanian Academy.

Heliade Rădulescu is considered one of the foremost champions of Romanian culture from the first half of the 19th century, having first risen to prominence through his association with Gheorghe Lazăr and his support of Lazăr's drive for discontinuing education in Greek. Over the following decades, he had a major role in shaping the modern Romanian language, but caused controversy when he advocated the massive introduction of Italian neologisms into the Romanian lexis. A Romantic nationalist landowner siding with moderate liberals, Heliade was among the leaders of the 1848 Wallachian revolution, after which he was forced to spend several years in exile. Adopting an original form of conservatism, which emphasized the role of the aristocratic boyars in Romanian history, he was rewarded for supporting the Ottoman Empire and clashed with the radical wing of the 1848 revolutionaries.

== Biography ==
=== Early life ===
Heliade Rădulescu was born in Târgoviște, into a family of Greek ancestry; he was the son of Ilie Rădulescu, a wealthy proprietor who served as the leader of a patrol unit during the 1810s, and Eufrosina Danielopol, a Greek woman, who was also educated in Greek. Three of his siblings died of bubonic plague before 1829. Throughout his early youth, Ion was the focus of his parents' affectionate supervision: early on, Ilie Rădulescu purchased a house once owned by the scholar Gheorghe Lazăr on the outskirts of Bucharest (near Obor), as a gift for his son. At the time, the Rădulescus were owners of a large garden in the Bucharest area, nearby Herăstrău, as well as of estates in the vicinity of Făgăraș and Gârbovi.

After basic education in Greek with a tutor known as Alexe, Ion Heliade Rădulescu taught himself reading in Romanian Cyrillic (reportedly by studying the Alexander Romance with the help of his father's Oltenian servants). He subsequently became an avid reader of popular novels, especially during his 1813 sojourn in Gârbovi (where he had been sent after other areas of the country came to be ravaged by Caragea's plague). After 1813, the teenaged Rădulescu was a pupil of the Orthodox monk Naum Râmniceanu; in 1815, he moved on to the Greek school at Schitu Măgureanu, in Bucharest, and, in 1818, to the Saint Sava School, where he studied under Gheorghe Lazăr's supervision.

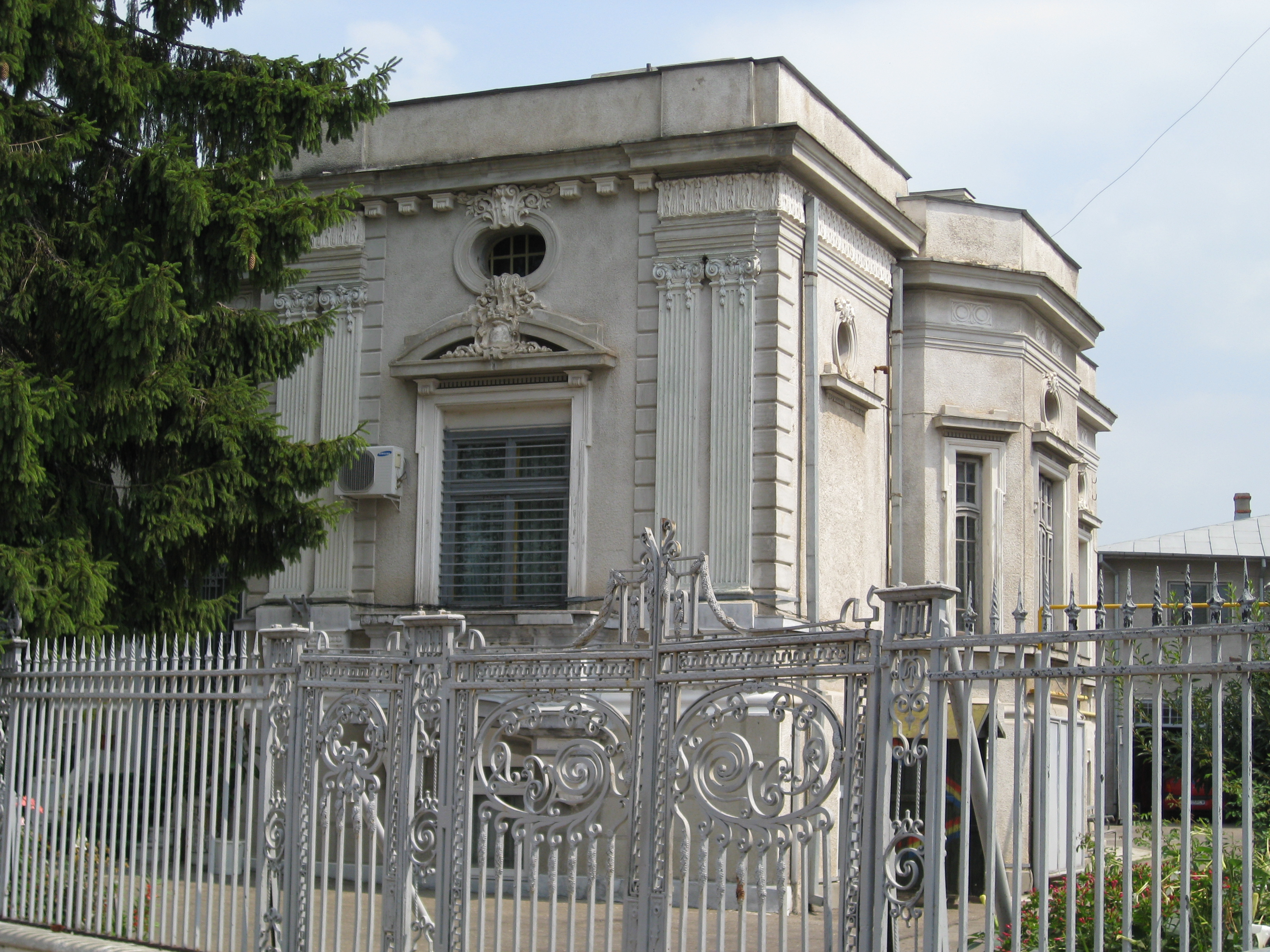
Site of Ion Heliade Rădulescu's birthplace in Târgoviște

Between his 1820 graduation and 1821, when effects of the Wallachian uprising led to the School ceasing its activities, he was kept as Lazăr's assistant teacher, tutoring in arithmetics and geometry. It was during those years that he adopted the surname Heliade (also rendered Heliad, Eliad or Eliade), which, he later explained, was a Greek version of his patronymic, in turn stemming from the Romanian version of Elijah.

=== Under Grigore Ghica ===
In 1822, after Gheorghe Lazăr had fallen ill, Heliade reopened Saint Sava and served as its main teacher (initially, without any form of remuneration). He was later joined in this effort by other intellectuals of the day, such as Eufrosin Poteca, and, eventually, also opened an art class overseen by the Croat Carol Valştain. This re-establishment came as a result of ordinances issued by Prince Grigore IV Ghica, who had just been assigned by the Ottoman Empire to the throne of Wallachia upon the disestablishment of Phanariote rule, encouraging the marginalization of ethnic Greeks who had assumed public office in previous decades. Thus, Prince Ghica had endorsed education in Romanian and, in one of his official firmans, defined teaching in Greek as "the foundation of evils" (temelia răutăţilor).

During the late 1820s, Heliade became involved in cultural policies. In 1827, he and Dinicu Golescu founded Soțietatea literară românească (the Romanian Literary Society), which, through its program (mapped out by Heliade himself), proposed Saint Sava's transformation into a college, the opening of another such institution in Craiova, and the creation of schools in virtually all Wallachian localities. In addition, Soţietatea attempted to encourage the establishment of Romanian-language newspapers, calling for an end to the state monopoly on printing presses. The grouping, headquartered on central Bucharest's Podul Mogoșoaiei, benefited from Golescu's experience abroad, and was soon joined by two future Princes, Gheorghe Bibescu and Barbu Dimitrie Știrbei. Its character was based on Freemasonry; around that time, Heliade is known to have become a Freemason, as did a large section of his generation.

In 1828, Heliade published his first work, an essay on Romanian grammar, in the Transylvanian city of Hermannstadt (which was part of the Austrian Empire at the time), and, on 20 April 1829, began printing the Bucharest-based paper Curierul Românesc. This was the most successful of several attempts to create a local newspaper, something Golescu first attempted in 1828. Publishing articles in both Romanian and French, Curierul Românesc had, starting in 1836, its own literary supplement, under the title of Curier de Ambe Sexe; in print until 1847, it notably published one of Heliade's most famous poems, Zburătorul. Curierul Românesc was edited as a weekly, and later as a bimonthly, until 1839, when it began to be issued three or four times a week. Its best-known contributors were Heliade himself, Grigore Alexandrescu, Costache Negruzzi, Dimitrie Bolintineanu, Ioan Catina, Vasile Cârlova, and Iancu Văcărescu.

In 1823, Heliade met Maria Alexandrescu, with whom he fell passionately in love, and whom he later married. By 1830, the Heliades' two children, a son named Virgiliu and a daughter named Virgilia, died in infancy; subsequently, their marriage entered a long period of crisis, marked by Maria's frequent outbursts of jealousy. Ion Heliade probably had a number of extramarital affairs: a Wallachian Militia officer named Zalic, who became known during the 1840s, is thought by some, including the literary critic George Călinescu, to have been the writer's illegitimate son. Before the death of her first child, Maria Heliade welcomed into her house Grigore Alexandrescu, himself a celebrated writer, whom Ion suspected had become her lover. Consequently, the two authors became bitter rivals: Ion Heliade referred to Alexandrescu as "that ingrate", and, in an 1838 letter to George Bariţ, downplayed his poetry and character (believing that, in one of his fables, Alexandrescu had depicted himself as a nightingale, he commented that, in reality, he was "a piteous rook dressed in foreign feathers"). Despite these household conflicts, Maria Heliade gave birth to five other children, four daughters and one son (Ion, born 1846).

=== Printer and court poet ===
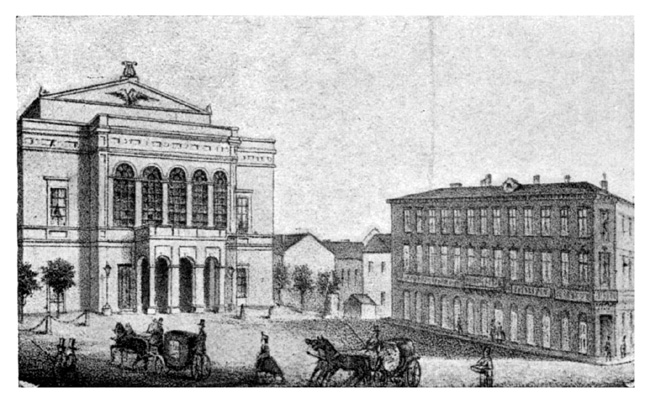
The old building of the National Theatre Bucharest in 1866

In October 1830, together with his uncle Nicolae Rădulescu, he opened the first privately owned printing press in his country, operating on his property at Cișmeaua Mavrogheni, in Obor (the land went by the name of Câmpul lui Eliad – "Eliad's Field", and housed several other large buildings). Among the first works he published was a collection of poems by Alphonse de Lamartine, translated by Heliade from French, and grouped together with some of his own poems. Later, he translated a textbook on meter and Louis-Benjamin Francoeur's standard manual of Arithmetics, as well as works by Enlightenment authors – Voltaire's Mahomet, ou le fanatisme, and stories by Jean-François Marmontel. They were followed, in 1839, by a version of Jean-Jacques Rousseau's Julie, or the New Heloise.

Heliade began a career as a civil servant after the Postelnicie commissioned him to print the Official Bulletin, and later climbed through the official hierarchy, eventually serving as Clucer. This rise coincided with the establishment of the Regulamentul Organic regime, inaugurated, upon the end of the Russo-Turkish War of 1828–1829, by an Imperial Russian administration under Pavel Kiselyov. When Kiselyov placed an order with Heliade for the printing of official documents, including the Regulament, the writer and his family were made prosperous by the sales. Nevertheless, Heliade maintained contacts with the faction of reformist boyars: in 1833, together with Ion Câmpineanu, Iancu Văcărescu, Ioan Voinescu II, Constantin Aristia, Ștefan and Nicolae Golescu, as well as others, he founded the short-lived Soţietatea Filarmonică (the Philharmonic Society), which advanced a cultural agenda (and was especially active in raising funds for the National Theater of Wallachia). Aside from its stated cultural goals, Soţietatea Filarmonică continued a covert political activity.

In 1834, when Prince Alexandru II Ghica came to the throne, Heliade became one of his close collaborators, styling himself "court poet". Several of the poems and discourses he authored during the period are written as panegyrics, and dedicated to Ghica, whom Heliade depicted as an ideal prototype of a monarch. As young reformists came into conflict with the prince, he kept his neutrality, arguing that all sides involved represented a privileged minority, and that the disturbances were equivalent to "the quarrel of wolves and the noise made by those in higher positions over the torn-apart animal that is the peasant". He was notably critical of the radical Mitică Filipescu, whom he satirized in the poem Căderea dracilor ("The Demons' Fall"), and later defined his own position with the words "I hate tyrants. I fear anarchy".

It was also in 1834 that Heliade began teaching at the Soţietatea Filarmonică's school (alongside Aristia and the musician Ioan Andrei Wachmann), and published his first translations from Lord Byron (in 1847, he completed the translation of Byron's Don Juan). The next year, he began printing Gazeta Teatrului Național (official voice of the National Theater, published until 1836), and translated Molière's Amphitryon into Romanian. In 1839, Heliade also translated Miguel de Cervantes' Don Quixote from a French source. The first collection of his own prose and poetry works saw print in 1836. Interested in the development of local art, he contributed a brochure on drawing and architecture in 1837, and, during the same year, opened the first permanent exhibit in Wallachia (featuring copies of Western paintings, portraits, and gypsum casts of various known sculptures).

By the early 1840s, Heliade began expanding on his notion that modern Romanian needed to emphasize its connections with other Romance languages through neologisms from Italian, and, to this goal, he published Paralelism între limba română şi italiană ("Parallelism between the Romanian language and Italian", 1840) and Paralelism între dialectele român şi italian sau forma ori gramatica acestor două dialecte ("Parallelism between the Romanian and Italian Dialects or the Form or Grammar of These Two Dialects", 1841). The two books were followed by a compendium, Prescurtare de gramatica limbei româno-italiene ("Summary of the Grammar of the Romanian-Italian Language"), and, in 1847, by a comprehensive list of Romanian words that had originated in Slavic, Greek, Ottoman Turkish, Hungarian, and German (see Romanian lexis). By 1846, he was planning to begin work on a "universal library", which was to include, among other books, the major the philosophical writings of, among others, Plato, Aristotle, Roger Bacon, René Descartes, Baruch Spinoza, John Locke, Gottfried Leibniz, David Hume, Immanuel Kant, Johann Gottlieb Fichte and Georg Wilhelm Friedrich Hegel.

=== 1848 Revolution ===
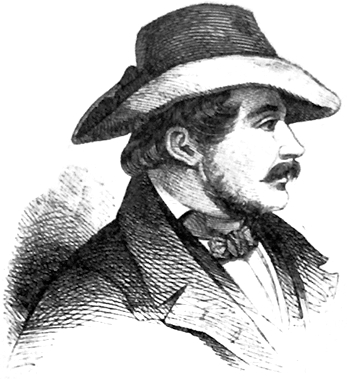
Heliade in 1848, detail of a group portrait of Provisional Government members

Before Alexandru Ghica was replaced with Gheorghe Bibescu, his relations with Heliade had soured. In contrast with his earlier call for moderation, the writer decided to side with the liberal current in its conspiratorial opposition to Bibescu. The so-called "Trandafiloff affair" of early 1844 was essential in this process – it was provoked by Bibescu's decision to lease all Wallachian mines to a Russian engineer named Alexander Trandafiloff, a measure considered illegal by the Assembly and ultimately ending in Bibescu's decision to dissolve his legislative. These events made Heliade publish a pamphlet titled Măceșul ("The Eglantine"), which was heavily critical of Russian influence and reportedly sold over 30,000 copies. It was centered on the pun alluding to Trandafiloff's name – trandafir cu of în coadă (lit. "a rose ending in -of", but also "a rose with grief for a stem"). Making additional covert reference to Trandafiloff as "the eglantine", it featured the lyrics:

Măi măceșe, măi măceșe,
[...]
Dă-ne pace și te cară,
Du-te dracului din țară.

Translation:

Eglantine, o eglantine,
[...]
Leave us in peace and go away,
Get the hell out of the country.

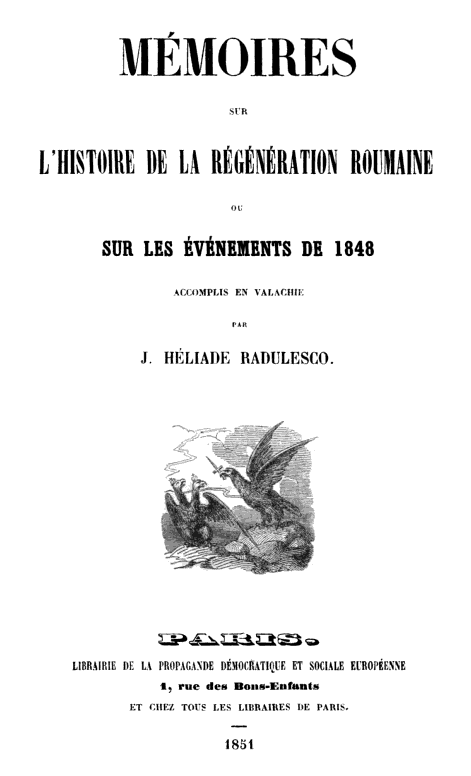
Title page of Mémoire sur l'histoire de la Regéneration Roumaine ou sur les événements de 1848 accomplis en Valachie (1851)

In spring 1848, when the first European revolutions had erupted, Heliade was attracted into cooperation with Frăţia, a secret society founded by Nicolae Bălcescu, Ion Ghica, Christian Tell, and Alexandru G. Golescu, and sat on its leadership committee. He also collaborated with the reform-minded French teacher Jean Alexandre Vaillant, who was ultimately expelled after his activities were brought to the attention of authorities. On 19 April 1848, following financial setbacks, Curierul Românesc ceased printing (this prompted Heliade to write Cântecul ursului, "The Bear's Song", a piece ridiculing his political enemies).

Heliade progressively distanced himself from the more radical groups, especially after discussions began on the issue of land reform and the disestablishment of the boyar class. Initially, he accepted the reforms, and, after the matter was debated within Frăţia just before rebellion broke out, he issued a resolution acknowledging this (the document was probably inspired by Nicolae Bălcescu). The compromise also set other goals, including national independence, responsible government, civil rights and equality, universal taxation, a larger Assembly, five-year terms of office for Princes (and their election by the National Assembly), freedom of the press, and decentralization. On 21 June 1848, present in Islaz alongside Tell and the Orthodox priest known as Popa Şapcă, he read out these goals to a cheering crowd, in what was to be the effective start of the uprising (see Proclamation of Islaz). Four days after the Islaz events, the revolution succeeded in toppling Bibescu, whom it replaced with a Provisional Government which immediately attracted Russian hostility. Presided over by Metropolitan Neofit, it included Heliade, who was also Minister of Education, as well as Tell, Ştefan Golescu, Gheorghe Magheru, and, for a short while, the Bucharest merchant Gheorghe Scurti.

Disputes regarding the shape of land reform continued, and in late July, the Government created Comisia proprietăţii (the Commission on Property), representing both peasants and landlords and overseen by Alexandru Racoviţă and Ion Ionescu de la Brad. It too failed to reach a compromise over the amount of land to be allocated to peasants, and it was ultimately recalled by Heliade, who indicated that the matter was to be deliberated once a new Assembly had been voted into office. In time, the writer adopted a conservative outlook in respect to boyar tradition, developing a singular view of Romanian history from a consideration of property and rank in Wallachia. In the words of historian Nicolae Iorga: "Eliad had wanted to lead, as dictator, this movement that added liberal institutions to the old society that had been almost completely maintained in place".

Like most other revolutionaries, Heliade favored maintaining good relations with the Ottoman Empire, Wallachia's suzerain power, hoping that this policy could help counter Russian pressures. As Sultan Abdülmecid I was assessing the situation, Süleyman Paşa was dispatched to Bucharest, where he advised the revolutionaries to carry on with their diplomatic efforts, and ordered the Provisional Government to be replaced by Locotenenţa domnească, a triumvirate of regents comprising Heliade, Tell, and Nicolae Golescu. Nonetheless, the Ottomans were pressured by Russia into joining a clampdown on revolutionary forces, which resulted, during September, in the reestablishment of Regulamentul Organic and its system of government. Together with Tell, Heliade sought refuge at the British consulate in Bucharest, where they were hosted by Robert Gilmour Colquhoun in exchange for a deposit of Austrian florins.

=== Exile ===
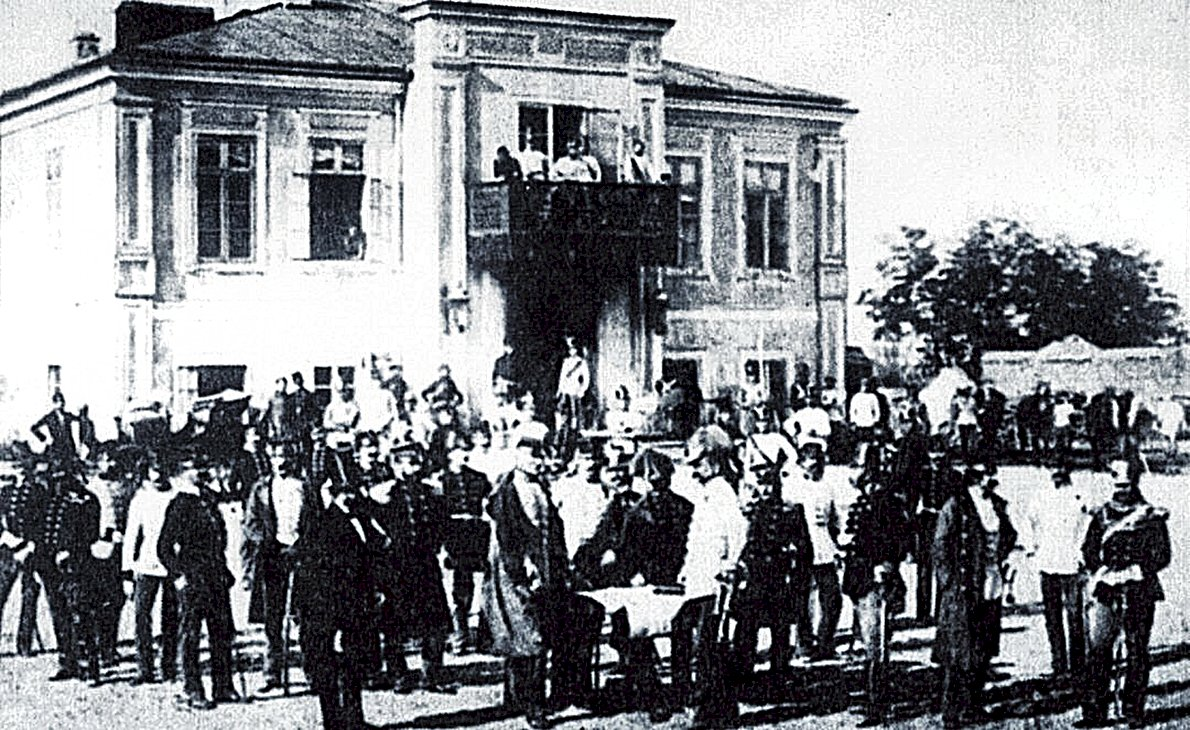
Johann Coronini-Cronberg and his troops in front of the Meitani House in Bucharest

Leaving his family behind, he was allowed to pass into the Austrian-ruled Banat, before moving into self-exile in France while his wife and children were sent to Ottoman lands. In 1850–1851, several of his memoirs of the revolution, written in both Romanian and French, were published in Paris, the city where he had taken residence. He shared his exile with Tell and Magheru, as well as with Nicolae Rusu Locusteanu.

It was during his time in Paris that he met with Pierre-Joseph Proudhon, the anarchist philosopher who had come to advance a moderate small-scale property project (to counter both economic liberalism and socialism). Heliade used this opportunity to make the Romanian cause known to the staff of Proudhon's La Voix de Peuple. Major French publications to which he contributed included La Presse, La Semaine, and Le Siècle, where he also helped publicize political issues pertaining to his native land. Heliade was credited with having exercised influence over historian Élias Regnault; Nicolae Iorga argued that Regnault's discarded his own arguments in favor of a unified Romanian state to include Transylvania (a concept which Heliade had come to resent), as well amending his earlier account of the 1848 events, after being exposed to "Eliad's propaganda".

While claiming to represent the entire body of Wallachian émigrés, Heliade had by then grown disappointed with the political developments, and, in his private correspondence, commented that Romanians in general were "idle", "womanizing", as well as having "the petty and base envies of women", and argued that they required "supervision [and] leadership". His fortune was declining, especially after pressures began for him to pay his many debts, and he often lacked the funds for basic necessities. At the time, he continuously clashed with other former revolutionaries, including Bălcescu, C. A. Rosetti, and the Golescus, who resented his ambiguous stance in respect to reforms, and especially his willingness to accept Regulamentul Organic as an instrument of power; Heliade issued the first in a series of pamphlets condemning young radicals, contributing to factionalism inside the émigré camp. His friendship with Tell also soured, after Heliade began speculating that the revolutionary general was committing adultery with Maria.

In 1851, Heliade reunited with his family on the island of Chios, where they stayed until 1854. Following the evacuation of Russian troops from the Danubian Principalities during the Crimean War, Heliade was appointed by the Porte to represent the Romanian nation in Shumen, as part of Omar Pasha's staff. Again expressing sympathy for the Ottoman cause, he was rewarded with the title of Bey. According to Iorga, Heliade's attitudes reflected his hope of "recovering the power lost" in 1848; the historian also stressed that Omar never actually made use of Heliade's services.

Later in the same year, he decided to return to Bucharest, but his stay was cut short when the Austrian authorities, who, under the leadership of Johann Coronini-Cronberg, had taken over administration of the country as a neutral force, asked for him to be expelled. Returning to Paris, Heliade continued to publish works on political and cultural issues, including an analysis of the European situation after the Peace Treaty of 1856 and an 1858 essay on the Bible. In 1859, he published his own translation of the Septuagint, under the name Biblia sacră ce cuprinde Noul şi Vechiul Testament ("The Holy Bible, Comprising the New and Old Testament").

As former revolutionaries, grouped in the Partida Naţională faction, advanced the idea of union between Wallachia and Moldavia in election for the ad hoc Divan, Heliade opted not to endorse any particular candidate, while rejecting outright the candidature of former prince Alexandru II Ghica (in a private letter, he stated: "let them elect whomever [of the candidates for the throne], for he would still have the heart of a man and some principles of a Romanian; only don't let that creature [Ghica] be elected, for he is capable of going to the dogs with this country").

=== Final years ===
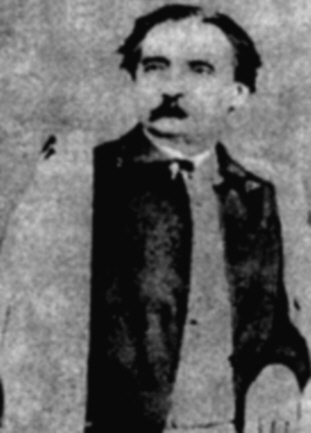
Photograph of an aging Heliade Rădulescu

Later in 1859, Heliade returned to Bucharest, which had become the capital of the United Principalities after the common election of Alexandru Ioan Cuza and later that of an internationally recognized Principality of Romania. It was during that period that he again added Rădulescu to his surname. Until his death, he published influential volumes on a variety of issues, while concentrating on contributions to history and literary criticism, and editing a new collection of his own poems. In 1863, Domnitor Cuza awarded him an annual pension of 2,000 lei.

One year after the creation of the Romanian Academy (under the name of "Academic Society"), he was elected its first President (1867), serving until his death. In 1869, Heliade and Alexandru Papiu-Ilarian successfully proposed the Italian diplomat and philologist Giovenale Vegezzi Ruscalla as honorary member of the Academy. By then, like most other 1848 Romantics, he had become the target of criticism from the younger generation of intellectuals, represented by the Iaşi-based literary society Junimea; in 1865, during one of its early public sessions, Junimea explicitly rejected works by Heliade and Iancu Văcărescu.

During the elections of 1866, Heliade Rădulescu won a seat in the Chamber as a deputy for the city of Târgovişte. As Cuza had been ousted from power by a coalition of political groupings, he was the only Wallachian deputy to join Nicolae Ionescu and other disciples of Simion Bărnuţiu in opposing the appointment of Carol of Hohenzollern as Domnitor and a proclamation stressing the perpetuity of the Moldo-Wallachian union. Speaking in Parliament, he likened the adoption of foreign rule to the Phanariote period. The opposition was nevertheless weak, and the resolution was passed with a large majority.

Among Ion Heliade Rădulescu's last printed works were a textbook on poetics (1868) and a volume on Romanian orthography. By that time, he had come to consider himself a prophet-like figure, and the redeemer of his motherland, notably blessing his friends with the words "Christ and Magdalene be with you!" His mental health declining, he died at his Bucharest residence on Polonă Street, nr. 20. Heliade Rădulescu's grandiose funeral ceremony attracted a large number of his admirers; the coffin was buried in the courtyard of the Mavrogheni Church.

== Heliade and the Romanian language ==
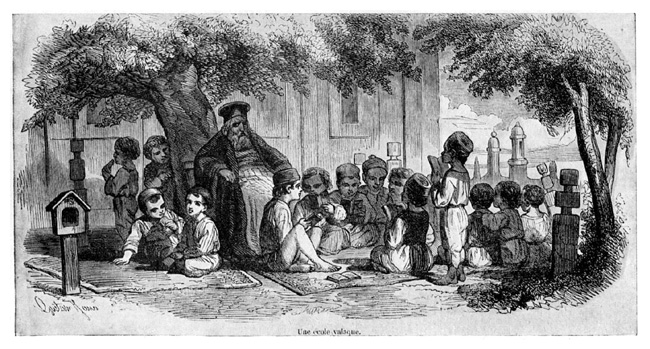
A typical open-air religious school in Bucharest during the 1840s

=== Early proposals ===
Heliade's most influential contributions are related to his interest in developing the modern Romanian language, in which he synthesized Enlightenment tenets and Romantic nationalist ideals of the 1848 generation. At a time when Romanian was being discarded by the educated in favor of French or Greek, he and his supporters argued in favor of adapting Romanian to the requirements of modernization; he wrote: "Young people, preoccupy yourselves with the national language, speak and write in it; prepare yourselves for its study, for its cultivation, – and cultivating a language means to write in it about all sciences and arts, about all eras and peoples. The language alone unites, strengthens and defines a nation; preoccupy yourselves with it first and foremost, as, through this, you shall be carrying out the most fundamental of policies, you shall be laying the foundation of nationality".

Heliade inaugurated his series of proposals for reforming the language in 1828, when his work on Romanian grammar called for the Cyrillic script to be reduced to 27 letters, reflecting phonetic spelling (for this rule, Heliade cited the example of the Latin alphabet as used in Ancient Rome). Soon after, he began a campaign in favor of introducing Romance neologisms, which he wanted to adapt to Romanian spelling. By that time, Romanians in various regions had grown aware of the need to unify the varieties of Romanian and create a standard Romanian lexis: this notion was first supported by the Transylvanians Gheorghe Şincai and Petru Maior, whose proposal was to unite Romanians around the issue of the choice of liturgical language, both Orthodox and Greek-Catholic (see Transylvanian School). Heliade, who first proposed a language regulator (an idea which was to be employed in creating the Romanian Academy), expanded on this legacy, while stressing that the dialect spoken in Muntenia, which had formed the basis of religious texts published by the 16th century printer Coresi, serve as the standard language.

In addition, he advocated aesthetical guidelines in respect to the standard shape of Romanian, stressing three basic principles in selecting words: "proper wording", which called for vernacular words of Latin origin to be prioritized; "harmony", which meant that words of Latin origin were to be used in their most popular form, even in cases where euphony had been altered by prolonged usage; and "energy", through which Heliade favored the primacy of the shortest and most expressive of synonyms used throughout Romanian-speaking areas. In parallel, Heliade frowned upon purist policies of removing widely used neologisms of foreign origin – arguing that these were "a fatality", he indicated that the gains of such a process would have been shadowed by the losses.

These early theories exercised a lasting influence, and, when the work of unifying Romanian was accomplished in the late 19th century, they were used as a source of inspiration: Romania's major poet of the period, Mihai Eminescu, himself celebrated for having created the modern literary language, gave praise to Heliade for "writing just as [the language] is spoken". This assessment was shared by Ovid Densusianu, who wrote: "Thinking of how people wrote back then, in thick, drawly, sleepy phrases, Heliade thus shows himself superior to all his contemporaries, and ... we can consider him the first prose writer who brings in the note of modernity".

=== Italian influence ===
A second period in Heliade's linguistic researches, inaugurated when he adopted Étienne Condillac's theory that a language could be developed from conventions, eventually brought about the rejection of his own earlier views. By the early 1840s, he postulated that Romanian and Italian were not distinct languages, but rather dialects of Latin, which prompted him to declare the necessity of replacing Romanian words with "superior" Italian ones. One of his stanzas, using his version of the Romanian Latin alphabet, read:

Primi auḑi-vor quel sutteranu resunetu
Şi primi salta-vor afara din grôpa
Sacri Poeţi que prea uşorâ ţêrinâi
Copere, şi quâror puţin d'uman picioarele împlumbă.

Approximated into modern Romanian and English, this is:

Primii auzi-vor acel subteran răsunet
Şi primii sălta-vor afară din groapă
Sacrii Poeţi ce prea uşoară ţărână-i
Acoperă, şi cărora de uman puţin picioarele le sunt legate.

Translation:

The first ones to hear that subterranean echo
And first to jump out of their pit will be
The sacred Poets whom only too light earth
Covers, and whose legs are superficially tied to humankind.

The target of criticism and ridicule, these principles were dismissed by Eminescu as "errors" and "a priori systems of orthography". During their existence, they competed with both August Treboniu Laurian's adoption of strong Latin mannerisms and the inconsistent Francized system developed in Moldavia by Gheorghe Asachi, which, according to the 20th century literary critic Garabet Ibrăileanu, constituted "the boyar language of his time". Ibrăileanu also noted that Asachi had come to admire Heliade's attempts, and had praised them as an attempt to revive the language "spoken by Trajan's men" – in reference to Roman Dacia.

While defending the role Moldavian politicians in the 1840s had in shaping modern Romanian culture, Ibrăileanu argued that practices such as those of Heliade and Laurian carried the risk of "suppressing the Romanian language", and credited Alecu Russo, more than his successors at Junimea, with providing a passionate defense of spoken Romanian. He notably cited Russo's verdict: "The modern political hatred aimed at [Russia] has thrown us into Italianism, into Frenchism, and into other -isms, that were not and are not Romanianism, but the political perils, in respect to the enslavement of the Romanian soul, have since passed; true Romanianism ought to hold its head up high". The literary critic George Călinescu also connected Heliade's experimentation to his Russophobia, in turn reflecting his experiences as a revolutionary: "Hating Slavism and the Russians, who had striven to underline [Slavic influences in Romanian], he said to himself that he was to serve his motherland by discarding all Slavic vestiges". Călinescu notably attributed Heliade's inconsistency to his "autodidacticism", which, he contended, was responsible for "[his] casual implication in all issues, the unexpected move from common sense ideas to the most insane theories".

Overall, Heliade's experiments had marginal appeal, and their critics (Eminescu included) contrasted them with Heliade's own tenets. Late in his life, Heliade seems to have acknowledged this, notably writing: "This language, as it is written today by people who can speak Romanian, is my work". One of the few authors to be influenced by the theory was the Symbolist poet Alexandru Macedonski, who, during his youth, wrote several pieces in Heliade's Italian-sounding Romanian. Despite Heliade's thesis being largely rejected, some of its practical effects on everyday language were very enduring, especially in cases where Italian words were borrowed as a means to illustrate nuances and concepts for which Romanian had no equivalent. These include afabil ("affable"), adorabil ("adorable"), colosal ("colossal"), implacabil ("implacable"), inefabil ("ineffable"), inert ("inert"), mistic ("mystical"), pervers ("perverse" or "pervert"), suav ("suave"), and venerabil ("venerable").

== Literature ==
=== Tenets ===
Celebrated as the founder of Wallachian Romanticism, Heliade was equally influenced by Classicism and the Age of Enlightenment. His work, written in a special cultural context (where Classiciasm and Romanticism coexisted), took the middle path between two opposing camps: the Romantics (Alecu Russo, Mihail Kogălniceanu and others) and the Classicists (Gheorghe Asachi, Grigore Alexandrescu, George Baronzi etc.). George Călinescu defined Heliade as "a devourer of books", noting that his favorites, who all played a part in shaping his style and were many times the subject of his translations, included: Alphonse de Lamartine, Dante Aligheri, Ludovico Ariosto, Torquato Tasso, Voltaire, Jean-François Marmontel, Jean-Jacques Rousseau, and François-René de Chateaubriand.

His poetic style, influenced from early on by Lamartine, was infused with Classicism during his middle age, before he again adopted Romantic tenets. Initially making use of guidelines set by Nicolas Boileau-Despréaux in respect to poetry, he came to oppose them after reading Victor Hugo's Romantic preface to Cromwell (without ever discarding them altogether).

Like the Classicists, Heliade favored a literature highlighting "types" of characters, as the union of universal traits and particular characteristics, but, like the Romantics, he encouraged writers to write from a subjective viewpoint, which he believed to be indicative of their mission as "prophets, ... men who criticize, who point out their society's plagues and who look on to a happier future, waiting for a savior". Through the latter ideal of moral regeneration, Heliade also complimented the Romantic stress on "national specificity", which he adopted in his later years. At the same time, he centered much of his own literary work on non-original material, either by compiling it from various translations or by translating from a single source – having his focus on creating the basis for further development by introducing samples of untapped literary genres and styles to Romanian literature.

While several of Heliade's contributions to literature have been considered to be of low importance, many others, above all his Romantic poem Zburătorul, are hailed as major accomplishments. Zburătorul, borrowing from Romanian mythology its main character (the eponymous incubus-like being who visits nubile girls at night) also serves to depict the atmosphere of a Wallachian village from that period. According to George Călinescu, the poem's value partly relies on its depiction of lust through the girls' eyes: "lacking the rages of Sappho and Phaedra. The puberty crisis is explained through mythology and cured through magic".

An 1837 essay of his, centered on a debate regarding the translation of Homer's works into Romanian, featured a series of counsels to younger writers: "This is not the time for criticism, children, it is the time for writing, so write as much and as good as you can, but without meanness; create, do not ruin; for the nation receives and blesses the maker and curses the destroyer. Write with a clear conscience". Paraphrased as "Write anything, boys, as long as you go on writing!" (Scrieţi, băieţi, orice, numai scrieţi!), this quote became the topic of derision in later decades, and was hailed as an example of Heliade's failure to distinguish between quality and quantity. The latter verdict was considered unfair by the literary historian Şerban Cioculescu and others, who argued that Ion Heliade Rădulescu's main goal was to encourage the rapid development of local literature to a European level. Although he recognized, among other things, Heliade's merits of having removed pretentious boyar discourse from poetry and having favored regular rhyme, Paul Zarifopol accused him and Gheorghe Asachi of "tastelessness" and "literary insecurity". He elaborated: "Rădulescu was arguably afflicted with this sin more than Asachi, given his unfortunate ambitions of fabricating a literary language".

Heliade's name is closely connected with the establishment of Romanian-language theater, mirroring the activities of Asachi in Moldavia. Ever since he partook in creating Soţietatea Filarmonică and the Bucharest Theater, to the moment of his death, he was involved in virtually all major developments in local dramatic and operatic art. In August 1834, he was one of the intellectuals who organized the first show hosted by Soţietatea Filarmonică, which featured, alongside a cavatina from Vincenzo Bellini's Il pirata, Heliade's translation of Voltaire's Mahomet. In subsequent years, members of the association carried out the translation of French theater and other foreign pieces, while encouraging Romanian-language dramatists, an effort which was to become successful during and after the 1840s (when Constantin Aristia and Costache Caragiale entered their most creative periods). Heliade himself advocated didacticism in drama (defining it as "the preservation of social health"), and supported professionalism in acting.

=== Historical and religious subjects ===
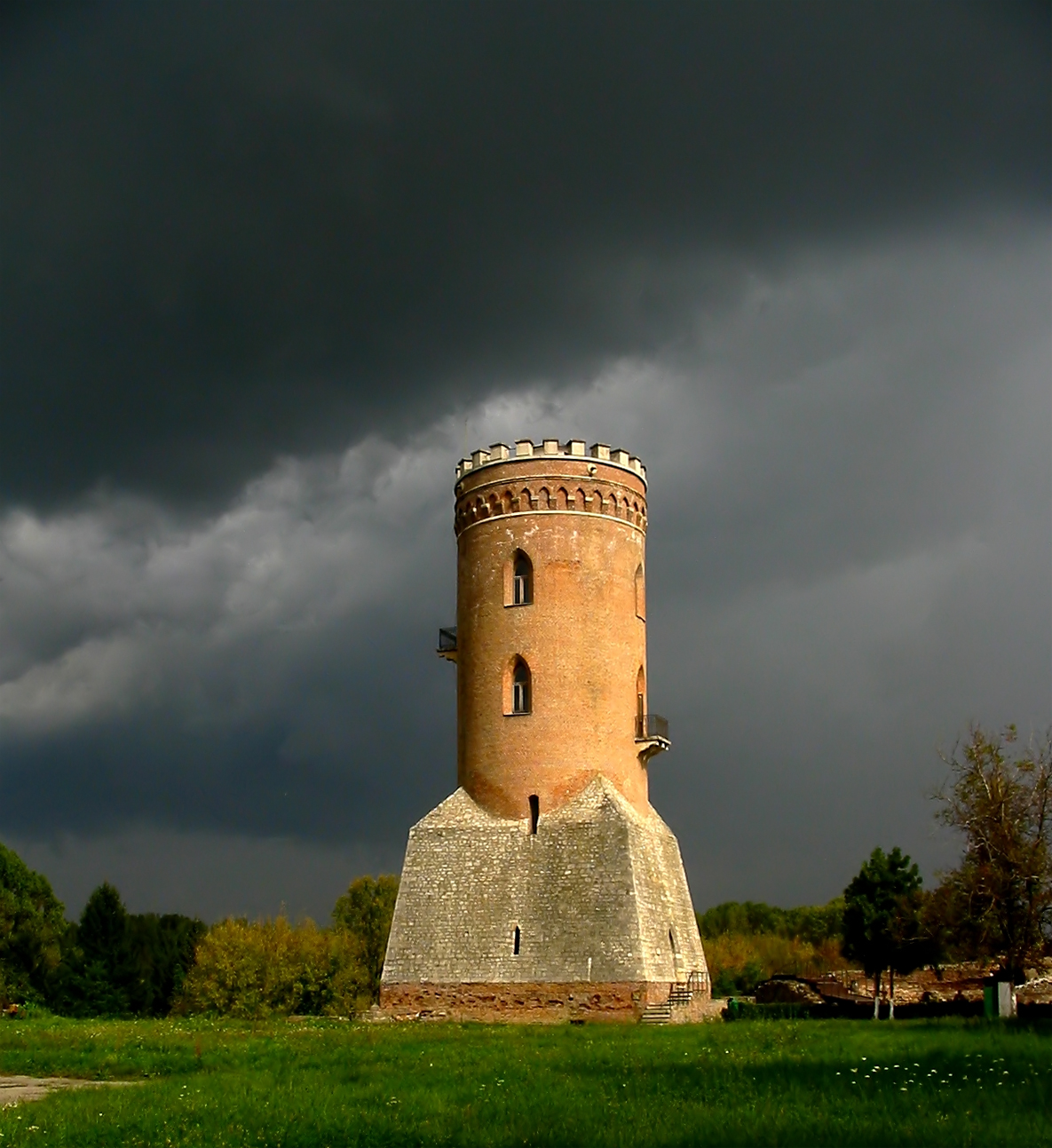
The Chindia Tower, part of the Târgovişte citadel site

Ion Heliade Rădulescu made extensive use of the Romantic nationalist focus on history, which he initially applied to his poetry. In this instance as well, the goal was to educate his public; he wrote: "Nothing is worthy of derision as much as someone taking pride in his parents and ancestors and nothing more worthy of praise than when the ancestors' great deeds serve as a model and an impulse for competition among descendants". The main historical figure in his poetry is the late 16th century Wallachian Prince Michael the Brave, the first one to rally Wallachia, Moldavia and Transylvania under a single rule: celebrated in Heliade's poem O noapte pe ruinele Târgoviştii ("A Night on the Ruins of Târgovişte"), he was to be the main character of a lengthy epic poem, Mihaiada, of which only two sections, written in very different styles, were ever completed (in 1845 and 1859 respectively). Other historical poems also expanded on the ideal of a single Romanian state, while presenting the 1848 generation as a model for future Romanian politicians.

Throughout the 1860s, one of Heliade's main interests was an investigation into the issues involving Romanian history during the origin of the Romanians and the early medieval history of the Danubian Principalities. At a time when, in Moldavia, the newly surfaced Chronicle of Huru traced a political lineage of the country to the Roman Empire through the means of a narrative which was later proven to be entirely fictional, Heliade made use of its theses to draw similar conclusions regarding Wallachia. His conservative views were thus expanded to the level of historiographic thesis: according to Heliade, boyars had been an egalitarian and permeable class, which, from as early as the times of Radu Negru, had adopted humane laws that announced and welcomed those of the French Revolution (he notably claimed that the county-based administration was a democratic one, and that it had been copied from the Israelite model as depicted in the Bible).

The ideal he expressed in a work of the period, Equilibru între antithesi ("A Balance between Antitheses") was moderate progressivism, with the preservation of social peace. In Tudor Vianu's view, partly based on earlier assessments by other critics, Equilibru, with its stress on making political needs coincide with social ones through the means of counterweights, evidenced strong influences from Pierre-Joseph Proudhon's thought, as well as vaguer ones from that of Georg Wilhelm Friedrich Hegel. Nonetheless, his system parted with Hegelianism in that, instead of seeking a balance between the Geist and existence, it considered the three states of human progress (Thesis, antithesis, synthesis) the reflection of a mystical number favored throughout history.

In parallel, Heliade worked on a vast synthesis of his own philosophy of history, based on his interpretation of Biblical theology. His 1858 work, Biblice ("Biblical Writings"), was supposed to form the first of four sections in a Christian history of the world. Referring to this project, Călinescu defined Heliade's ideas as "interesting, no matter how naïve at times, in general Voltairian and Freemason [in shape]". Biblicele partly evidenced Heliade's interests in the Talmud and Zohar-like gematria – with emphasis placed on the numbers 3, 7, and 10 – , as well as ample references to the Sephirot. One of his original thoughts on the matter was a reference to "deltas" (triangles) of deities – Elohim-Spirit-Matter and Spirit-Matter-the Universe. A portion of Heliade Rădulescu's poems also draw on religious themes and discourse. According to George Călinescu, the poet had attempted to create a parallel to both The Divine Comedy and the Bible, from Genesis to Revelation, with a style influenced by Lamartine and Victor Hugo.

=== Satire and polemics ===
Heliade was aware of the often negative response to his work: in a poem dedicated to the memory of Friedrich Schiller, he expanded on the contrast between creation and social setting (in reference to mankind, it stressed Te iartă să faci răul, iar binele nici mort – "They forgive the evil committed against them, but never the good"). A noted author of satire, he used it as a vehicle to criticize social customs of his day, as well as to publicize personal conflicts and resentments. As a maverick, he attacked political figures on both sides: conservatives who mimicked liberalism were the subject of his Areopagiul bestielor ("The Areopagus of the Beasts"), while many other of his post-1848 prose and poetry pieces mocked people on the left wing of liberalism, most notably C. A. Rosetti and his supporters. During and after his exile, his conflicts with Cezar Bolliac and Ion Ghica also made the latter two the target of irony, most likely based on Heliade's belief that they intended to downplay his contributions to the Wallachian Revolution of 1848.

His autobiographical pieces, marked by acid comments on Greek-language education, and, in this respect, similar to the writings of his friend Costache Negruzzi, also display a dose of self-irony. The enduring polemic with Grigore Alexandrescu, as well as his quarrel with Bolliac, formed the basis of his pamphlet Domnul Sarsailă autorul ("Mr. Old Nick, the Author"), an attack on what Heliade viewed as writers whose pretensions contrasted with their actual mediocrity. In other short prose works, Ion Heliade Rădulescu commented on the caricature-like nature of parvenu Bucharesters (the male prototype, Coconul Drăgan, was "an ennobled hoodlum", while the female one, Coconiţa Drăgana, always wished to be the first in line for the unction).

In various of his articles, he showed himself a critic of social trends. During the 1830s, he reacted against misogyny, arguing in favor of women's rights: "Who has made man create himself unfair laws and customs, in order for him to cultivate his spirit and forsake [women] into ignorance...?". In 1859, after the Jewish community in Galaţi fell victim to a pogrom, he spoke out against Antisemitic blood libel accusations: "Jews do not eat children in England, nor do they in France, nor do they in Germany, nor do they do so wherever humans have become humans. Where else are they accused of such an inhumane deed? Wherever peoples are still Barbaric or semi-Barbaric".

A large portion of Heliade's satirical works rely on mockery of speech patterns and physical traits: notable portraits resulting from this style include mimicking the manner of Transylvanian educators (with their strict adherence to Latin etymologies), and his critique of the exophthalmos Rosetti (with eyes "more bulged than those of a giant frog"). Without sharing Heliade's views on literature, the younger Titu Maiorescu drew comparisons with his predecessor for launching into similar attacks, and usually in respect to the same rivals.

== In cultural reference ==
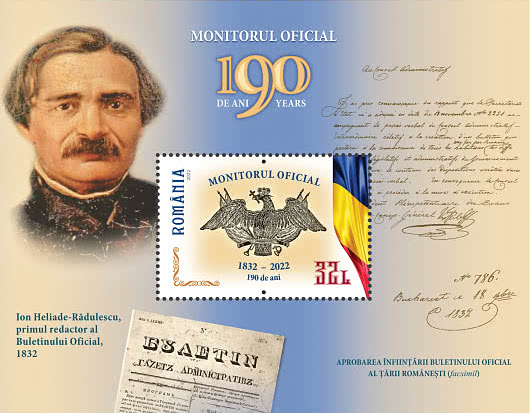
2022 stamp sheet of Romania dedicated to the 190th anniversary of Monitorul Oficial and its first editor, Ion Heliade Rădulescu

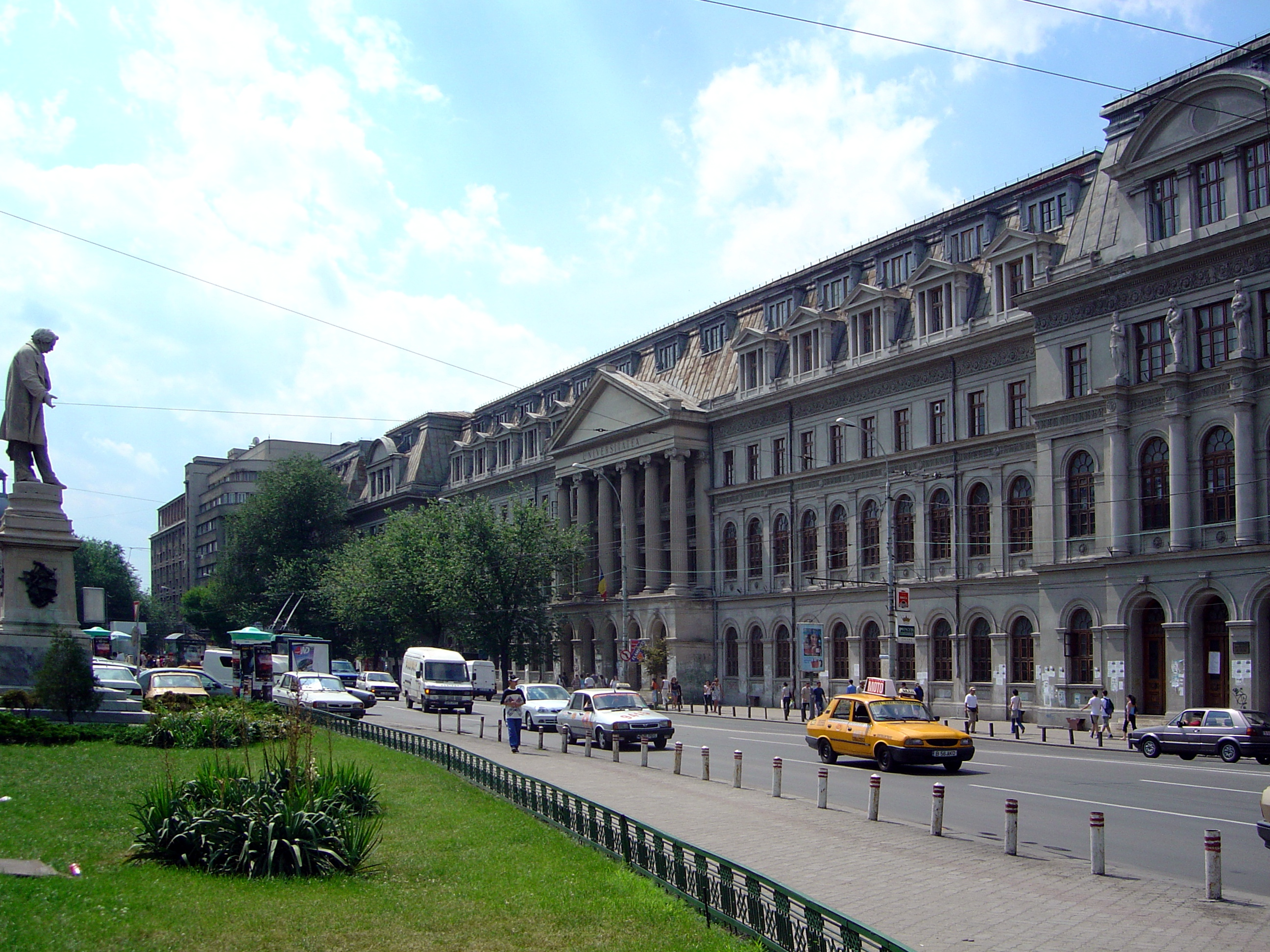
Monument to Heliade Rădulescu, opposite the University of Bucharest building

A monument to Ion Heliade Rădulescu, sculpted by the Italian artist Ettore Ferrari, stands in front of the University building in central Bucharest. In addition to naming a lecture room after him, the Romanian Academy has instituted the Ion Heliade Rădulescu Award – in 1880, it was awarded to Bogdan Petriceicu Hasdeu, for his Cuvinte den bătrâni, and worth 5,000 gold lei. Ten years after, the prize was the center of a scandal, involving on one side the dramatist Ion Luca Caragiale and, on the other, the cultural establishment formed around members of the National Liberal Party, including Hasdeu and Dimitrie Sturdza. The latter disapproved of Caragiale's anti-Liberal stance and his association with Junimea, as well as to his anti-nationalism, dislike of didacticism, and alleged cosmopolitanism. They thus refused to grant him the prize.

A high school in his native Târgovişte bears the name Ion Heliade Rădulescu, as does a village in the commune of Ziduri, Buzău County. The grave of Take Ionescu, an influential political figure and one-time Prime Minister of Romania who was Heliade's descendant, is situated in Sinaia Monastery, in the immediate vicinity of a fir tree planted by Heliade and his fellow 1848 revolutionaries.

In his 1870 poem Epigonii ("The Epigones"), Mihai Eminescu paid tribute to early Romanian-language writers and their contributions to literature. An entire stanza is dedicated to Heliade:

Eliad zidea din visuri şi din basme seculare
Delta biblicelor sânte, profeţiilor amare,
Adevăr scăldat în mite, sfinx pătrunsă de-nţeles;
Munte cu capul de piatră de furtune deturnată,
Stă şi azi în faţa lumii o enigmă nesplicată
Şi vegheaz-o stâncă arsă dintre nouri de eres.

Translation:

Out of dreams and secular tales, Eliad was building
The delta of Biblical saints, of bitter prophecies,
Truth bathed in myth, a sphinx imbued with meaning;
A mountain with its head of stone misplaced by the storm,
He still stands today, before the world, as an unsolved enigma
And watches over a burnt rock from between clouds of heresy.

During the early 1880s, Alexandru Macedonski and his Literatorul attempted to preserve Heliade's status and his theories when these were faced with criticism from Junimea; by 1885, this rivalry ended in defeat for Macedonski, and contributed to the disestablishment of Literatorul.

Although a Junimist for a large part of his life, Ion Luca Caragiale himself saw a precursor in Heliade, and even expressed some sympathy for his political ideals. During the 1890s, he republished a piece by Heliade in the Conservative Party's main journal, Epoca. One of Caragiale's most significant characters, the Transylvanian schoolteacher Marius Chicoş Rostogan, shares many traits with his counterparts in Heliade's stories. Developing his own theory, he claimed that there was a clear difference between, on one hand, the generation of Heliade Rădulescu, Ion Câmpineanu, and Nicolae Bălcescu, and, on the other, the National Liberal establishment formed around Pantazi Ghica, Nicolae Misail and Mihail Pătârlăgeanu – he identified the latter grouping with hypocrisy, demagogy, and political corruption, while arguing that the former could have found itself best represented by the Conservatives.

Comments about Heliade and his Bucharest statue feature prominently in Macedonski's short story Nicu Dereanu, whose main character, a daydreaming Bohemian, idolizes the Wallachian writer. Sburătorul, a modernist literary magazine of the interwar period, edited by Eugen Lovinescu, owed its name to Zburătorul, making use of an antiquated variant of the name (a form favored by Heliade). During the same years, Camil Petrescu made reference to Heliade in his novel Un om între oameni, which depicts events from Nicolae Bălcescu's lifetime.

In his Autobiography, the Romanian philosopher Mircea Eliade indicated that it was likely that his ancestors, whose original surname was Ieremia, had adopted the new name as a tribute to Heliade Rădulescu, whom they probably admired.
