= Dimitrie Bolintineanu =

Romanian poet, diplomat and politician

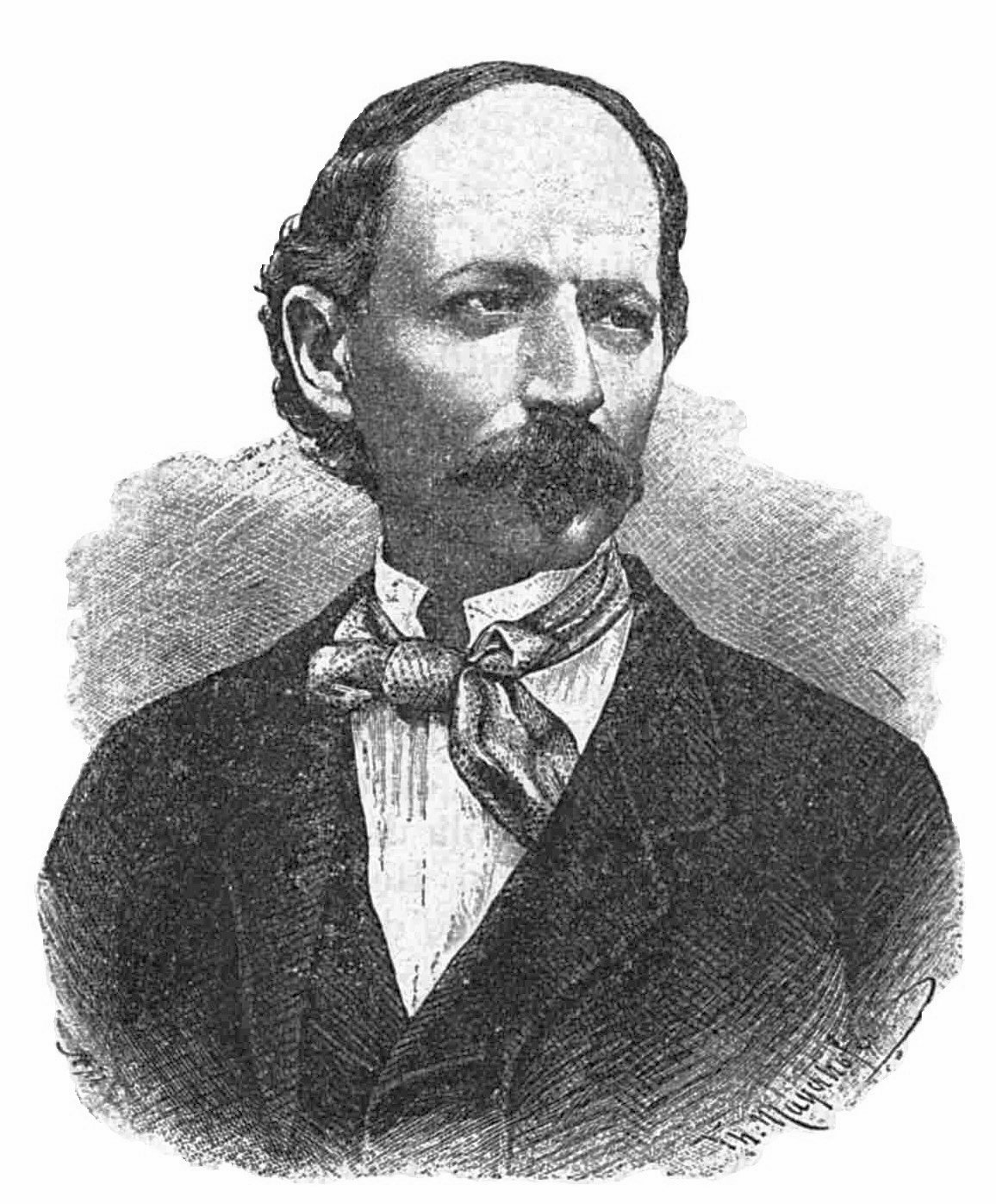
Dimitrie Bolintineanu

Dimitrie Bolintineanu (Romanian pronunciation: [diˈmitri.e bolintiˈne̯anu]; 14 January 1819 (1825 according to some sources), Bolintin-Vale – 20 August 1872, Bucharest) was a Romanian poet, though he wrote in many other styles as well, diplomat, politician, and a participant in the revolution of 1848. He was of Aromanian origin. His poems of nationalist overtone fueled emotions during the unification of Wallachia and Moldavia.

== Biography ==
Dimitrie Bolintineanu was of Aromanian origin, his father, Ienache Cosmad, came from Ohrid. In a few years his father, Ienache, made a successful carrier in Wallachia, first he was a tenant, small owner, then sub-prefect, with the residence in Bolintin-Vale, a village near Bucharest; he did not manage to leave to his second-born son, Dimitrie, some property for relieve.

He remained orphan of both parents since 1831, and was raised by relatives. He started to earn for a living since yearly youth, being a civil servant much as Grigore Alexandrescu, Ion Luca Caragiale, or Mihai Eminescu. In 1841, he was a clerk at the State Secretariat, in 1843 a secretary at the department of "Suddito Reasons". In 1844, it is a riddle how he was raised to the rank of Pitar (a boyar who supervised the bakeries). In 1842, he published a poem, "A young girl on the bed of death", that was eulogistically presented by Ion Heliade Rădulescu (and later recited by Mihai Eminescu in Epigones), who probably played a decisive role. The poem was an imitation after "La jeune captive” ("The Young Prisoner"), by André Chénier, and was published in "Courier of Ambe Sexes".

== Participant in the 1848 revolution ==
The revolution of 1848 brought a newspapers explosion. If C. A. Rosetti had issued, immediately after the shot, "The Romanian child", Bolintineanu led (from 19 July to 11 September) "The Sovereign People". It was a small, four-page sheet with only two columns on each side, but the chief editor had big projects. He wanted to print a "journal of democratic interests and social progress", according to the French model - Le Peuple souverain.

After the revolution of 1848, Bolintineanu came back to the country and edited together with Nicolae Bălcescu, Cezar Bolliac, and others "The sovereign people", but – when the revolution ceased - he was exiled and went to Transylvania, then to Constantinople, and finally to Paris to continue his interrupted studies.

== Exile ==
In 1855, Grigore Ghica offered him a chair of Romanian literature in Iași, but the Porte did not allow him to enter the country, and then he traveled through Palestine, Egypt, Syria, and Macedonia, describing them all in various publications, which often include interesting and warmly written pages.

In 1859, returning to the country, he entered into the politics and became Minister of Foreign Affairs, Cults and Public Instruction. Thanks to his efforts and of Costache Negri and V. A. Urechia, the first schools were set up for Macedonian Romanians. In the same year, in 1859, he received the third degree in the Steaua Danube Lodge of Bucharest, and in 1864, he was a member of the Brotherhood Lodge.

== Illness and death ==
In the first half of 1870, Dimitrie Bolintineanu traveled to Paris. Some of his historical biographies were reedited. Prints the collection of satire of Menadele and the volume of poems Romania's Complaints. He collaborated, by April, with the Romanian of C. A. Rosetti. Being seriously ill, he was forced to quit his work. In 1871, Bolintineanu's disease worsened. The poet was poor. The pension he received went into the pockets of creditors. The officials refused to give him any help. In April, a lottery with personal Bolintineanu’s stuff was organized, at the initiative of Gheorghe Sion. On 28 April, at the National Theater in Bucharest a performance took place, for the benefit of the former member of the theater committee. On 25 June, a group of MP’s (including Cezar Bolliac) proposed to the Chamber of Deputies to vote on a national reward "for our good poet Dimitrie Bolintineanu, who is deprived of the existence of all days". Sent for the approval and acceptance in the division, the proposal was buried in files. Bolintineanu developed a mental illness from misery and poverty.

The poet was admitted to Pantelimon Hospital. In the patients’ register book was written: "Dimitrie Bolintineanu, former Minister of Cults, entered without clothes". In 1872, the lottery that was initiated in 1871 by George Sion took place in March. Bolintineanu's books were won by Vasile Alecsandri, the bookcase of the library by Costache Negri, and the other furniture by Catinca Balș. Alecsandri and Negri asked that the objects that belonged to Bolintineanu remain to him. On 20 August, in the morning, he died in the hospital. He was buried at Bolintinul din Vale.

== Literary work ==
Dimitrie Bolintineanu has written extensively both prose and lyrics. His poetic work includes the cycles of the Historical Legends, the Bosphorus Flowers, the Fairy Tales, the Macedonians and the Reverions.

Dimitrie Bolintineanu wrote Manoil (published in 1855), which is considered to be the first Romanian novel (if one excludes from the definition of novel the allegorical literary work Istoria ieroglifică by Dimitrie Cantemir, which was written between 1703 and 1705). Bolintineanu also published the novel Elena (1862). While these two novels are largely forgotten today, they are considered relevant from the point of view of describing Romanian society in the mid-19th century. Nicolae Filimon is considered the father of the Romanian novel, having written the influential novel Ciocoii vechi și noi (1863).
