= Vasile Cârlova =

Romanian writer

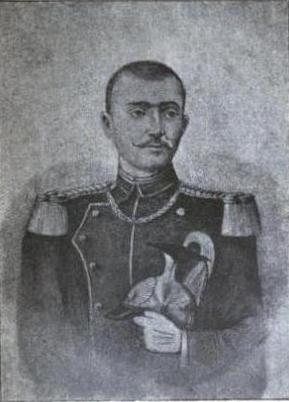
- Born: February 4, 1809; Buzău, Wallachia
- Died: September 18, 1831 (aged 22); Craiova, Wallachia
- Occupations: poet, officer
- Writing career
- Period: 1827–1831
- Genre: lyric poetry
- Literary movement: Romanticism

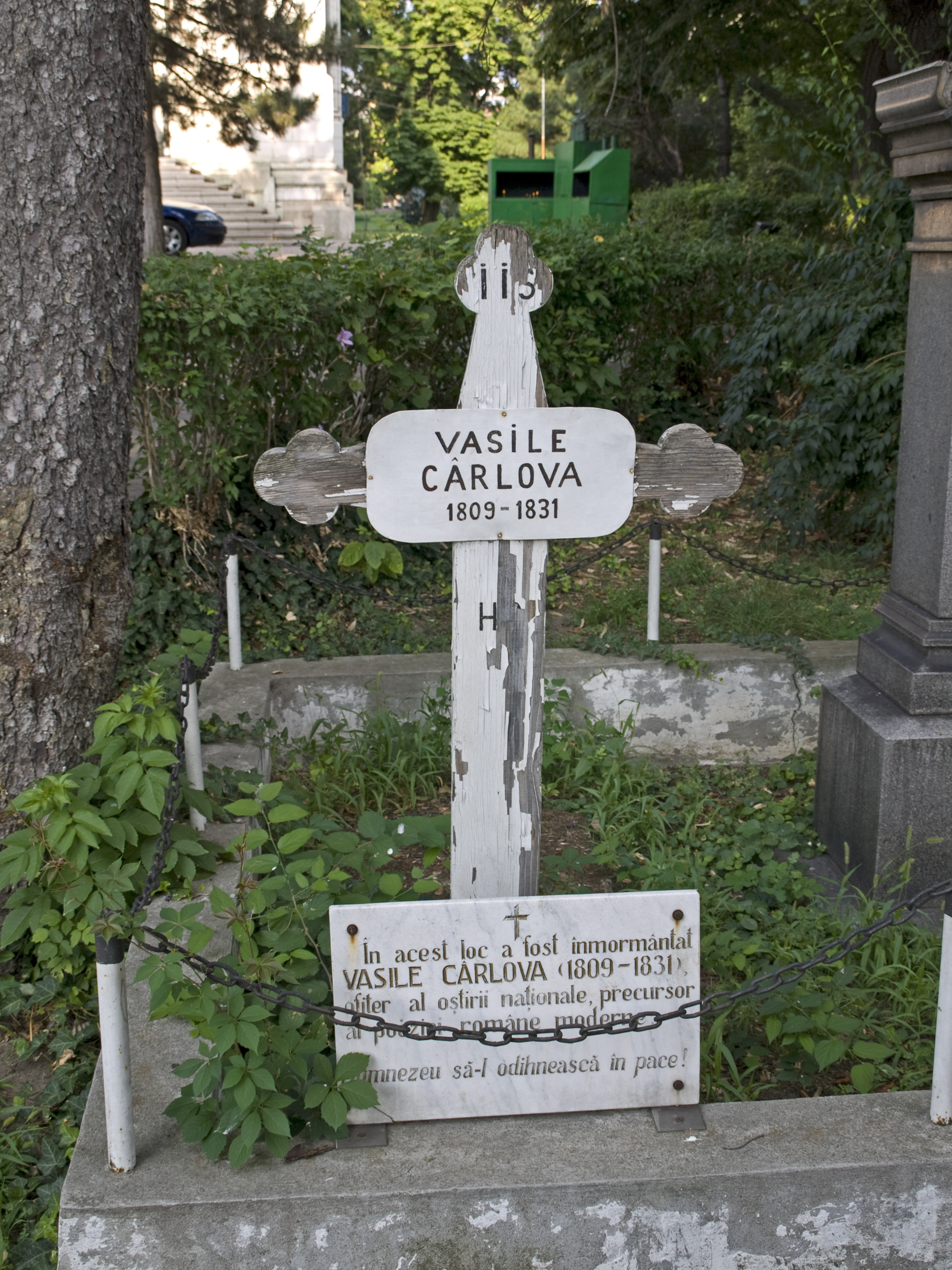
Tomb of Vasile Cârlova

Vasile Cârlova (Romanian pronunciation: [vaˈsile ˈkɨrlova]; February 4, 1809 – September 18, 1831) was a Wallachian officer and early Romantic poet.

== Biography ==
Born into a low-ranking Romanian boyar family in Buzău, Cârlova remained an orphan in 1816, and, after being adopted by an aunt, moved to Craiova. He studied together with Grigore Alexandrescu, learning Greek and French.

In 1827, he wrote his first poem, Păstorul întristat (The Sad Shepherd), which was first published in 1830, with the help of Ion Heliade Rădulescu. A year later, he authored Ruinurile Târgoviştei (The Ruins of Târgovişte) and Rugăciune (Prayer). In 1829, Cârlova wrote Înserare (Nightfall).

In 1830, the year when his poems were published, he enlisted to the newly created Wallachian National Militia, a nucleus of the future Romanian Army created under the Regulamentul Organic regime, being its 33rd volunteer and bearing the rank of Second Lieutenant. The following year, Cârlova wrote Marşul românilor (The Romanians' March), a patriotic poem that could not be printed due to censorship and circulated on leaflets. He died soon after that, after falling ill with an infectious disease. Cârlova is buried in Craiova.
