= Curierul Românesc =

- Publisher: Ion Heliade Rădulescu
- Founded: April 18, 1829
- Language: Romanian

Curierul Românesc was a Romanian-language newspaper published in Bucharest in 1829. It was the first newspaper in the language.
