= Mayeux =

Mayeux is a French surname. Notable people with the surname include:

- Melissa Mayeux (born 1998), French baseball player
- Chase Mayeux American entrepreneur, investor, decentralized finance early adopter
- Molly Mayeux American film producer

== See also ==
- Saint-Mayeux a commune of Côtes-d'Armor, Brittany, France
