= Historical names of Transylvania =

Transylvania has had different names applied to it in several traditions.

== Transylvania ==
The first reference to the region was as the Medieval Latin expression terra ultra silvam ("land beyond the forest") in a document dating to 1075. The expression Partes Transsylvanæ ("area beyond the forest") appears in the 12th century in Legenda Sancti Gerhardi and subsequently as Transsilvania in medieval documents of the Hungarian kingdom.

== Ardeal/Erdély ==
The first Hungarian form recorded was Erdeuelu (12th century, in the Gesta Hungarorum) while the first Romanian form recorded was in 1432 as Ardeliu. The initial a/e difference between the names can be found in other Hungarian loans in Romanian, such as Hungarian egres ‘gooseberry’ → Romanian agriș, agreș, as well as in placenames, e.g., Egyed, Erdőd, Erdőfalva, Esküllő → Adjud, Ardud, Ardeova, and Așchileu.

In the early 16th century, the Erdőség form, literally 'forest', was also used in Hungarian (Érdy-codex).

According to the Romanian linguist Nicolae Drăganu, the Romanian Ardeal came from the Hungarian Erdély. The Hungarian name of Transylvania evolved over time from Erdőelü, Erdőelv, Erdőel, Erdeel in chronicles and written charters from 1200 up to late 1300. In written sources from 1390, we can find also the form Erdel, which can be read also as Erdély. There is evidence for that in the written Wallachian Chancellery Charters expressed in Slavonic where the word appears as Erûdelû (1432), Ierûdel, Ardelîu (1432), ardelski (1460, 1472, 1478–1479, 1480, 1498, 1507–1508, 1508), erdelska, ardelska (1498). With the first texts written in Romanian (1513) the name Ardeal appears to be written.

Drăganu takes into consideration the form Ardalos for the inherited word, dismissing it by proving that the evolution of such an etymon according to Romanian phonetics does not match the current form. Drăganu claims that the greatest Romanian philologists and historians maintain that Ardeal came from Hungarian. This theory is also supported by the Romanian historian Ioan-Aurel Pop, according to which the Romanians didn't have a name for the region as a whole. Transylvania, not being a state organized and ruled by a Romanian political power, did not have a specific name in the Romanian language. For administrative, communication and coexistence reasons, the name Ardeal was adopted from the Hungarian Erdély.

The consensus of linguists and historians on the etymology of both Erdély and Transylvania is as follows:

- The modern Hungarian form Erdély was derived from the Old Hungarian Erdeuelu/Erdevelu (transcription: Erdő-elü), literally ‘beyond the forest’ (Hungarian: Erdőelve). Erdő means ‘woods, forest’, and the elv suffix meant ‘beyond’ and was applied to a type of border region (gyepű) and the associated social and economic organisation; for example, Gyepűelve (near Ungvár), and archaic Havaselve, ‘Wallachia’, lit. "beyond the snowy mountains" (Transalpina in Latin, modern Havasalföld), refers to a region lying beyond the Carpathian Mountains if viewed from Hungary, and was under strong Hungarian political influence during the Middle Ages. If viewed from Hungary, Erdő-elü probably refers to the fact that the Transylvanian plateau is separated in the northwest from the Great Hungarian Plain and Crișana plains by the well-forested Apuseni mountains. Alternatively, from the point of view east of the Carpathians, the name could suggest that the Hungarian name was created in Etelköz/Atelkuzu (Hungarian homeland in southern Ukraine), prior to settling on the Hungarian plain.
- The Medieval Latin form Ultrasylvania (1077), later Transylvania (from another point of view after the foundation of Hungary in 895), was a direct translation from the Hungarian form.

In Ukrainian and German, the names Zalissia (Ukrainian: Залісся) and Überwald, both meaning "beyond the forest" are also used.

== Siebenbürgen ==
The oldest occurrences of this form are from the 13th century:

- In the year 1241: in Annales Sancti Trudperti and in the Annals of Zwifalt: "Tartari terras Pannonie, Septum urbium, Moraviae vestaverunt”
- In the year 1242: in the notes of the friar Erfurt: "Eodem anno Tartari in Ungaria, terra scilicet Septem castrorum, civitatem dictam Hermanii villam in Aprili expugnantes, usque ad centum ibi peremerunt...”
- In the year 1285: "Eodem anno Tarthari terram Ungarie que dicitur Septemcastris, intraverunt et multos christianos captivaverunt et occiderunt” and "...quid audientes Septemcastrenses”.
- In the year 1296: a reference to a particular "maister Dietrich von Siebenbuergen”.
- In the year 1300: Ottacher of Styria mentions "Sybenburger”.

There exist a number of theories on the etymology of Siebenbürgen, the German name for Transylvania.

The most widely accepted theory is that Siebenbürgen refers to the seven principal fortified towns of the Transylvanian Saxons. The name first appeared in a document from 1296. An alternate Medieval Latin version, Septem Castra ("Seven fortresses") was also used in documents. The towns alluded to are Bistritz (Bistrița, Beszterce), Hermannstadt (Sibiu, Nagyszeben), Klausenburg (Cluj-Napoca, Kolozsvár), Kronstadt (Brașov, Brassó), Mediasch (Mediaș, Medgyes), Mühlbach (Sebeș, Szászsebes), and Schässburg (Sighișoara, Segesvár).

God wanted them to move to Pannonia as soon as possible. Then they crossed mountains for three months, and finally, against the will of the said peoples, they reached the border area of Pannonia, the land now called Transylvania. When they marched into this land, fearing the attack of the surrounding peoples, the whole corps of the militants under their command was divided into seven armies, and captains, lieutenants, corporals were appointed in the usual manner to lead each army, and each army consisted of thirty thousand and eight hundred and fifty-seven armed warriors. Because at the time of their second exodus from Scythia, from the one hundred and eight tribes, two hundred and sixteen thousand armed men were reportedly brought with them, that is, two thousand of every tribe, except those of the household. Over these seven armies, a captain was assigned to lead each of them, and seven hillforts were built to protect their wives and animals and they remained in those castles for a time. This is why the Germans call this part of the land Siebenbürgen, meaning seven castles to this day.

— Johannes Thuróczy: Chronica Hungarorum

Other theories include:

- Siebenbürgen means "Seven Castles" but does not refer to the towns of the Transylvanian Saxons. Transylvania and the Mureș valley seem to have been the first portion of land within the Carpathians where Magyars gained a foothold. According to legend, each of the seven Magyar chieftains erected an earthen 'castle' in this region.
- Siebenbürgen means explicitly "Seven Towns" or "Seven Castles". However, this etymology seems to originate in the dialectical tradition of the first, mainly Low German, Flemish and Dutch settlers, in whose homelands there are hilly regions called "Zevenbergen" (a town in North Brabant, the Netherlands) and "Sevenbergen" (east of the town of Hameln on the river Weser, Germany).
- Saxon settlement in Transylvania began in Sibiu. An early German name for the town was Cibinburg (akin to the Cibiniensis Latin name of the area). The alternate name Cibinburg was corrupted into Siebenbürgen, and became the name for the whole region.

The Slavic names of the region Sedmigradsko or Sedmogradsko (Седмиградско or Седмоградско) in Bulgarian, Sedmogradska in Croatian, Sedmograjska in Slovene, Sedmihradsko in Czech, Sedmohradsko in Slovak, Siedmiogród in Polish, Semihorod (Семигород) in Ukrainian), as well as its Walloon name (Zivenbork), are translations of the German one.

== Caucaland ==
According to Roman historian Ammianus Marcellinus, "due to the high forests and mountains Caucaland is an inaccessible place". ("Caucalandensis locus, altitudine silvarum inacessus et montium") Modern historians agree that the territory he mentions is Transylvania. Archaeologist Kornél Bakay linked this toponym with the Hungarian mountain names in the Southern Carpathians, usually ending in -kő (stone).
