= Grigore Alexandrescu =

Romanian poet and translator (1810–1885)

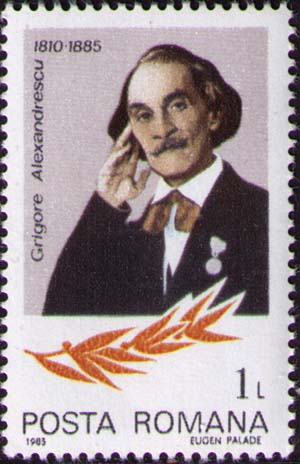

Grigore Alexandrescu (Romanian pronunciation: [ɡriˈɡore aleksanˈdresku]; 22 February 1810, Târgoviște – 25 November 1885 in Bucharest) was a nineteenth-century Romanian poet and translator noted for his fables with political undertones.

He founded a periodical, Albina Românească. Alexandrescu wrote Poezii (1832, 1838, 1839) and Meditații (1863), many of which were fables and satires influenced by French literature.

== Works (summary) ==
- Poezii (1832)
- Fabule (1832)
- Meditații (1835)
- Poezii (1838)
- Fabule (1838)
- Poezii (1839)
- Memorial (1842)
- Poezii (1842)
- Suvenire și impresii, epistole și fabule (1847)
- Meditații, elegii, epistole, satire și fabule (1863)
