= Ion Negulici =

Romanian painter

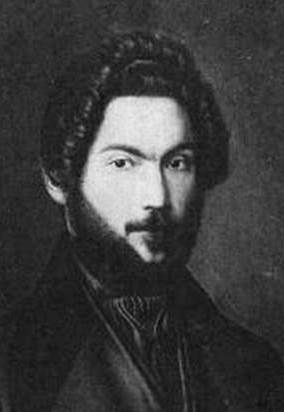
Self-portrait (date unknown)

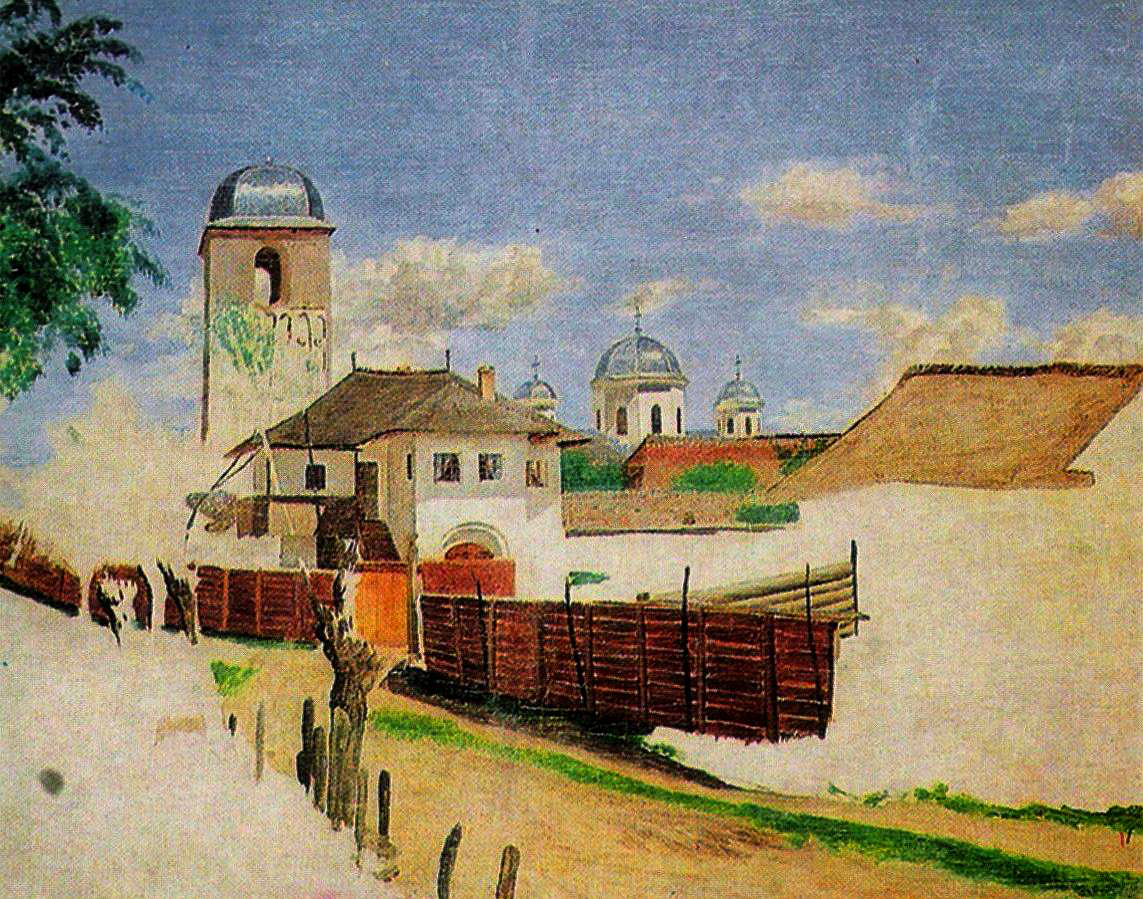
Church in Câmpulung (unfinished)

Ion Negulici (1812 in Câmpulung – 5 April 1851 in Istanbul) was a Romanian painter who participated in the Wallachian Revolution of 1848.

== Biography ==
His father was a priest and he learned the rudiments of art by painting icons. Later, he went to Bucharest, where he studied at the "School of Decorative Arts", operated by Ana Rosetti, then to Iași, where he continued his studies with Niccolò Livaditti. He was diagnosed with tuberculosis in 1830, but still travelled to Athens, where he received praise for his portraits. In 1840, this enabled him to win a scholarship to Rome, but he preferred Paris and completed his artistic training there with Léon Cogniet and Michel Martin Drolling, followed by a stay in Vienna to learn lithography.

When he returned, he joined the literacy campaign of Ion Heliade-Rădulescu, providing engravings and other illustrations, as well as doing translations from French and editing the magazine Curierul Românesc, for which he wrote numerous articles. He also produced a novel, a play and a book of Romanian neologisms.

He was a member of the revolutionary society "Frăția", and participated in the events of 1848, helping to produce and print a manifesto. He served briefly as the prefect of Prahova County; appointed by the revolutionary Interior Minister, Nicolae Golescu. After the revolutionaries were defeated, he took refuge in Brașov, but was captured and sentenced to internal exile in Bursa, where his tuberculosis worsened. He died while under treatment in Istanbul.

Drawings and lithographs predominate among his works, and he is best known for his portraits, which include Cezar Bolliac, Nicolae Bălcescu, C.A. Rosetti and Constantin Daniel Rosenthal. He was also one of Romania's first landscape painters.
