= Effingham Grant =

British-Romanian businessman (1820 - 1892)

- Born: 1820; Guernsey, Channel Islands
- Died: 1892 (aged 71–72); Bucharest, Kingdom of Romania
- Occupations: Diplomat, businessman
- Spouse: Zoe Racoviță (m. 1850–1892)
- Children: Constantin, Nicolae, Robert Effingham
- Parents: Edward Effingham Grant (father); Marie Le Lacheur (mother)
- Relatives: Maria Rosetti, Sophia, Ann Mayer, Eliza Marian

Effingham Grant (1820–1892) was a British diplomat, businessman, and philanthropist who settled in Romania.

== Biography ==
He was born on the island of Guernsey, the first child and only son of Lieutenant Edward Effingham Grant (born in Markyate, Hertfordshire in 1795) and Marie Grant (born Marie Le Lacheur in Saint Peter Port in 1789). He had four living sisters: Maria Rosetti (b. Marie Grant in 1819), Sophia (b. 1821), Ann Mayer (b. 1822), and Eliza Marian (b. 1824).

In 1837 Effingham Grant found a vacancy at the British Consulate in Wallachia, under the command of Sir Robert Gilmour Colquhoun, who would take care of his training. A year later, his sister, Marie, paid him a visit and decided to move to Bucharest. It was then that she met C. A. Rosetti, Grant's close friend and a member of the Rosetti family of boyars, who fell in love with her and later married her.

On October 28, 1850 Grant married Zoe Racoviță (1827–1892), the daughter of Alexandru Racoviță and Ana Golescu, and the granddaughter of Dinicu Golescu. After the marriage, the family came into possession of the Belvedere Palace and the related estate, inherited by Zoe. The neighborhood where their residence was (between Gara de Nord and the Giulești Military Hospital) is now called Cartierul Grant (the Grant Quarter).

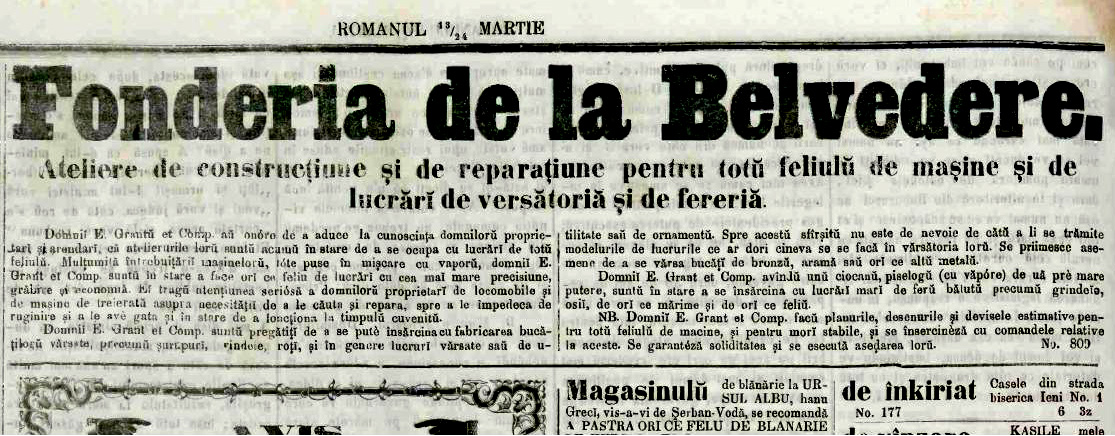
Announcement of the establishment of the Belvedere Foundry, 1864

In 1849, Grant was sent by Colquhoun to Transylvania, to meet with Józef Bem and obtain a first-hand report on the Russian intervention in the area, during the Hungarian Revolution. In a letter from 1851, addressed to Henry Palmerston, the British Foreign Secretary, Colquhoun mentioned selecting Grant as secretary when he was only 16, noted that Grant had become very competent in French, German, Italian, Greek, and Romanian, and praised the way he handled his official duties, particularly in 1848–1849 (at the time of the Wallachian Revolution). In late 1853 Colquhoun went on a fact-finding mission to Bosnia, Serbia, and Herzegovina. At the start of the Crimean War, Grant was left in charge of the British Consulate in Bucharest; in early January 1854 he was reporting to the Foreign Office on Russian pressures in Wallachia. In early April the Russians requested the departure of Western consuls from Bucharest; he was given permission to leave his post, and leave the British subjects under the protection of the Belgian consul.

Grant later decided to give up his diplomatic career and to devote himself to business. In 1861 he had already opened a department store called "The English Shop" in Bucharest. In 1863 he established the Foundry E. Grant & Co. Belvedere, the first foundry in Bucharest. He also built there a large workshop for assembling and repairing agricultural machinery. In 1865, at the National Exhibition of Agriculture and Industry, he was awarded a silver medal for his "collection of machineries, mainly for the steam mill handled by men, and particularly for his initiative of setting up the first foundry in the country and of spreading lots of foreign agricultural machineries". All that remains nowadays from that industrial establishment is the water tower.

In 1864, Grant founded the first tobacco processing workshop in Romania, the Manufactura de Tutun de la Belvedere (Belvedere Tobacco Factory). Grant established in 1879 the Regia Monopolurilor Statului in the area; he parceled out the land around the factory and sold it to the workers, giving birth to what would become the Regie neighborhood of Sector 6 of Bucharest. He was also responsible for the construction of a bread factory on Calea Plevnei; as early as 1863, he brought equipment from the United Kingdom for this purpose, and the building was completed in 1868. In 1865 Grant began a new business, growing orchids; later, this business gave the name of Strada Orhideelor (Orchid Street). Another toponymic in the neighborhood was Groapa lui Ouatu (Ouatu's Pit), named after a certain Mr. Watt, a business associate of Grant.

Grant was also the editor of the political newspaper Concordia, which supported the National Liberal Party.

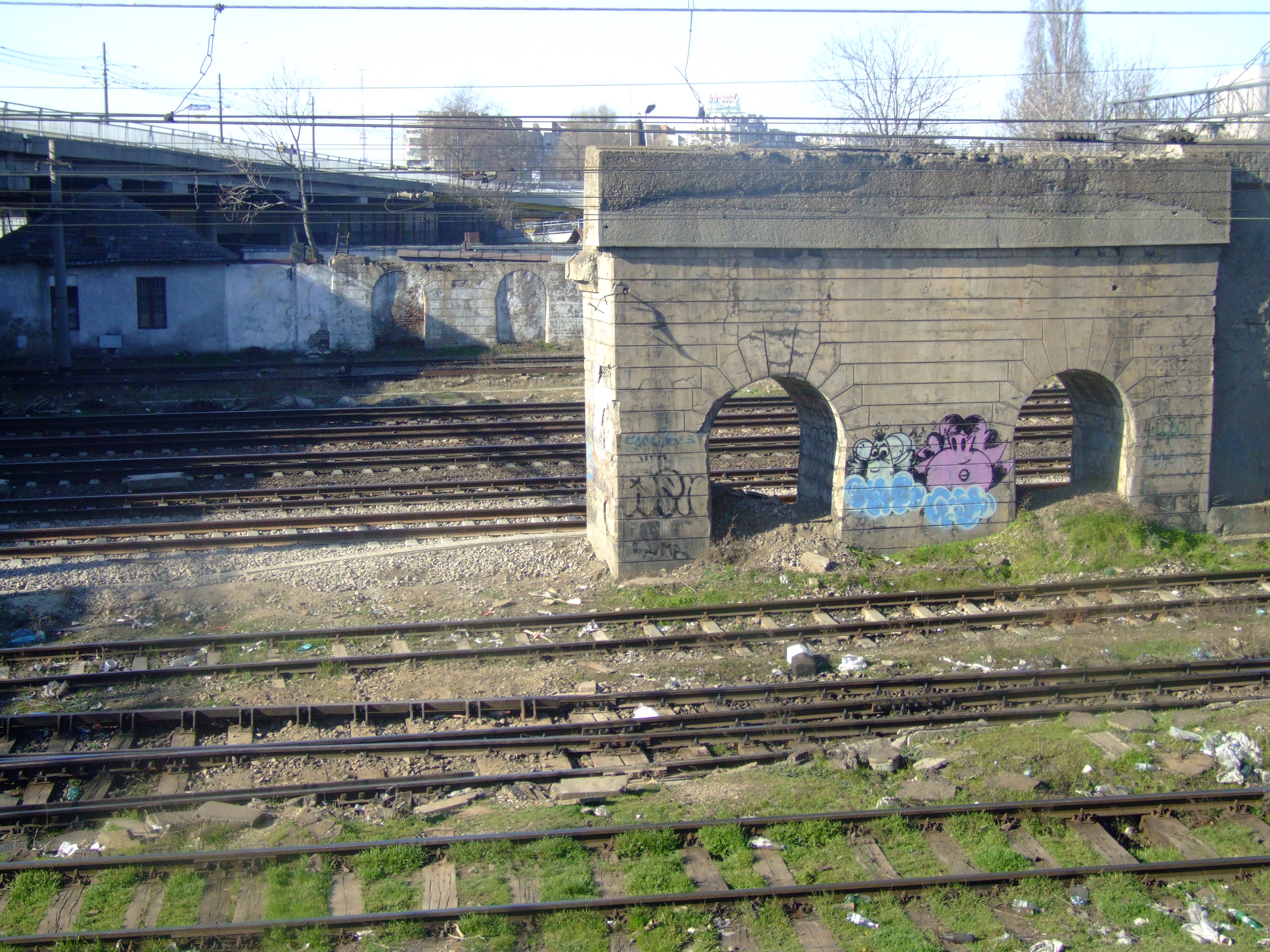
Remains of Podul Grant in Bucharest

One of his sons, Constantin Grant, fought as a soldier in the Romanian War of Independence, and then in Algeria with the French Foreign Legion, while another son, Nicolae Grant (1868–1950), became a noted painter. A third son was the civil engineer Robert Effingham Grant, who participated in the construction of Podul Grant; the bridge, built in 1910, was named after Effingham Grant.
