= Maria Rosetti =

Romanian journalist, editor (1819 - 1893)

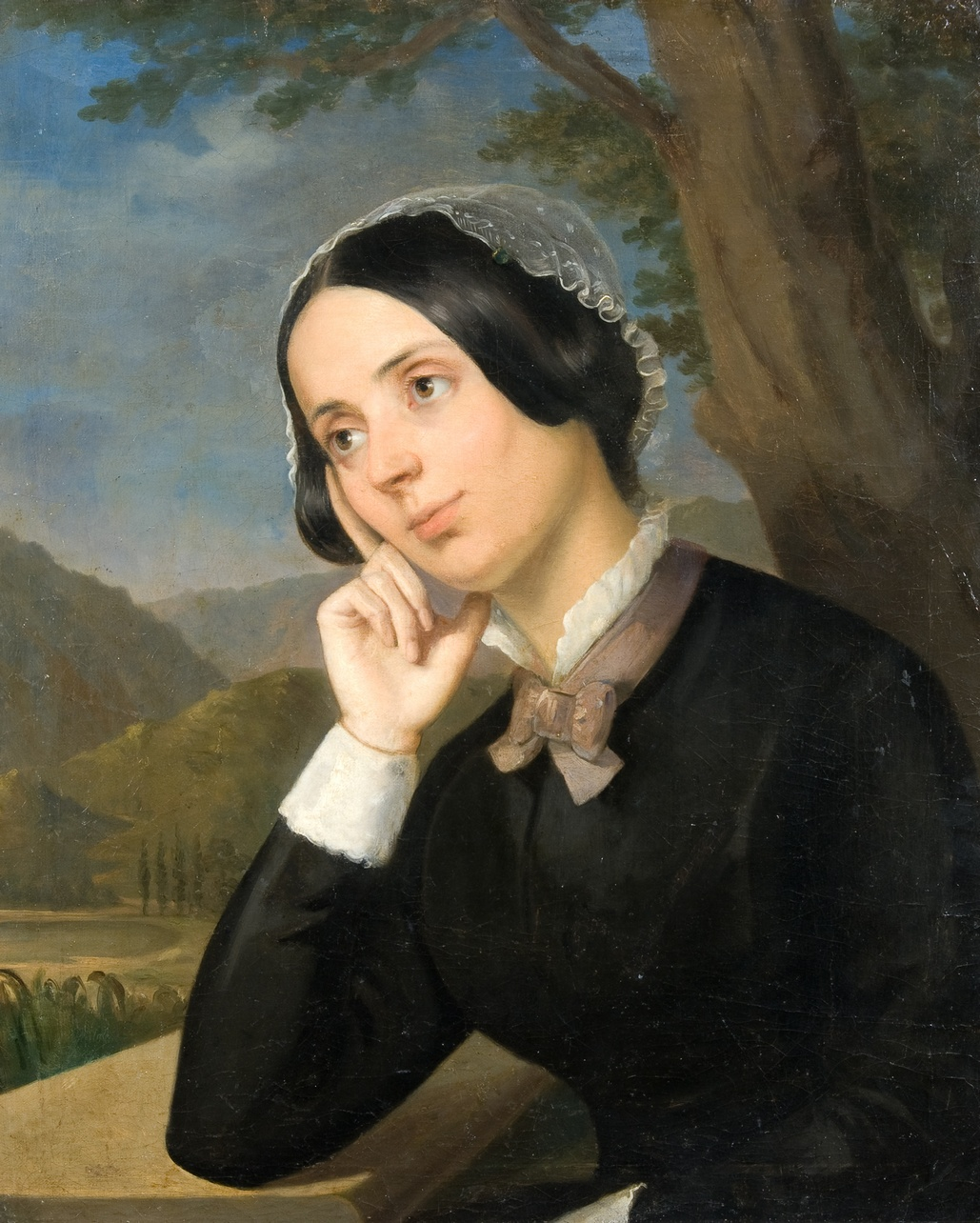
Constantin Daniel Rosenthal's portrait of Maria Rosetti

Princess Maria Rosetti (born Marie Grant; 1819 – 25 February [O.S. 13 February] 1893) was a Guernsey born Wallachian and Romanian political activist, journalist, essayist, philanthropist and socialite. The sister of British diplomat Effingham Grant and wife of radical leader C. A. Rosetti, she played an active part in the Wallachian Revolution of 1848. She was also noted for her enduring friendships with the painter Constantin Daniel Rosenthal and with Pia Brătianu, the wife of National Liberal politician Ion Brătianu. The Rosettis were parents to eight sons: Mircea, Ion, Vintilă (journalist and writer), Horia, Elena-Maria, Toni, Floricel and Libertatea Sophia, all of whom were noted for their political activities.

== Biography ==
Born to Captain Edward Grant, a ship-owning resident of Guernsey, and his Guernsey wife Marie Le Lacheur, Marie belonged to the Church of England. The Grants, who eventually settled in Plymouth, claimed lineage from the Scottish Clan Grant of Cannon, but this is uncertain.

=== Life ===
In 1837, her younger brother Effingham was appointed secretary of Robert Gilmour Colquhoun, the British consul in Wallachia; soon after, Mary herself arrived in Bucharest, where she began work as a tutor. It was then that she met Rosetti, Effingham Grant's close friend and a member of the Rosetti family of boyars, who fell in love with her. Mary Grant was employed by the family of Wallachian Militia Colonel Ioan Odobescu, and gave lessons to his children—including his son Alexandru, the future writer and politician. At the time, she was residing in the Bucharest area around Curtea Veche.

Grant married C. A. Rosetti at her family's house in Plymouth, with an Anglican service (August 31, 1847); they remarried later in Vienna, through an Orthodox ceremony. The latter was attended by Rosetti's collaborators, Ştefan and Alexandru Golescu, who were the couple's godfathers. According to historian Paul Cernovodeanu, she met difficulty in integrating boyar society, but "[her] innate qualities, noble demeanor, intelligence and culture did not fail [...] to impose her".

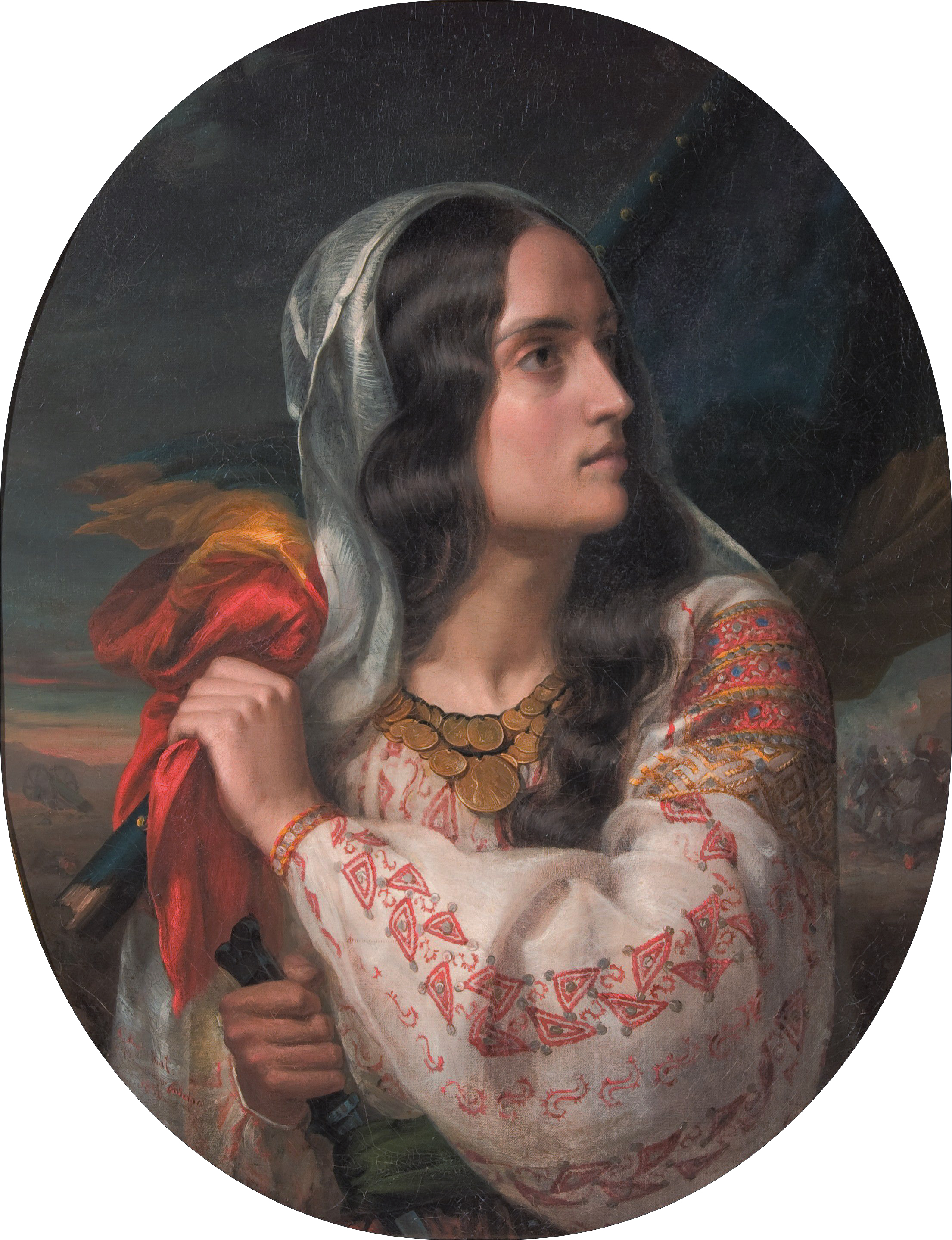
Revolutionary Romania, painted by Rosenthal in homage to Rosetti

During the 1848 revolution, her husband played a prominent part in rallying the Bucharest populace to the radical cause, and sat on the Provisional Government. As Ottoman troops entered the country, crushing the rebellion and arresting its leaders, he was himself taken into Ottoman custody and, together with other prominent participants, transported by barge from Giurgiu, on his way to the Austrian-ruled Sviniţa, near the Danube port of Orschowa. With the Jewish Constantin Daniel Rosenthal, Maria followed the ships on shore; upon arrival, she pointed out to the local authorities that the Ottomans had stepped out of their jurisdiction, persuading the mayor of Sviniţa to disarm the guards, which in turn allowed the prisoners to flee. The Rosettis then made their way to France. Her role in this last stage of the revolution was celebrated by French historian Jules Michelet in his 1851 essay Madame Rosetti, and by her husband, who compared her to Anita, the Brazilian-born wife of Italian insurgent Giuseppe Garibaldi.

Around 1850, Rosenthal completed one of his most celebrated paintings, România revoluţionară ("Revolutionary Romania"). A national personification showing a woman in Romanian folk costume, it was also a portrait of Maria Rosetti. The artist died in July 1851, after his attempt to cross into Wallachia was intercepted by Austrian authorities, who tortured him to death in his native Budapest. In 1878, Maria Rosetti authored a piece for her Mama şi Copilul ("Mother and Child") magazine, in which she offered praise to her deceased friend: "[Rosenthal was] one of the best and the most loyal people that God created after His image. He died for Romania, for its liberties; he died for his Romanian friends. [...] This friend, this son, this martyr of Romania is an Israelite. His name was Daniel Rosenthal."

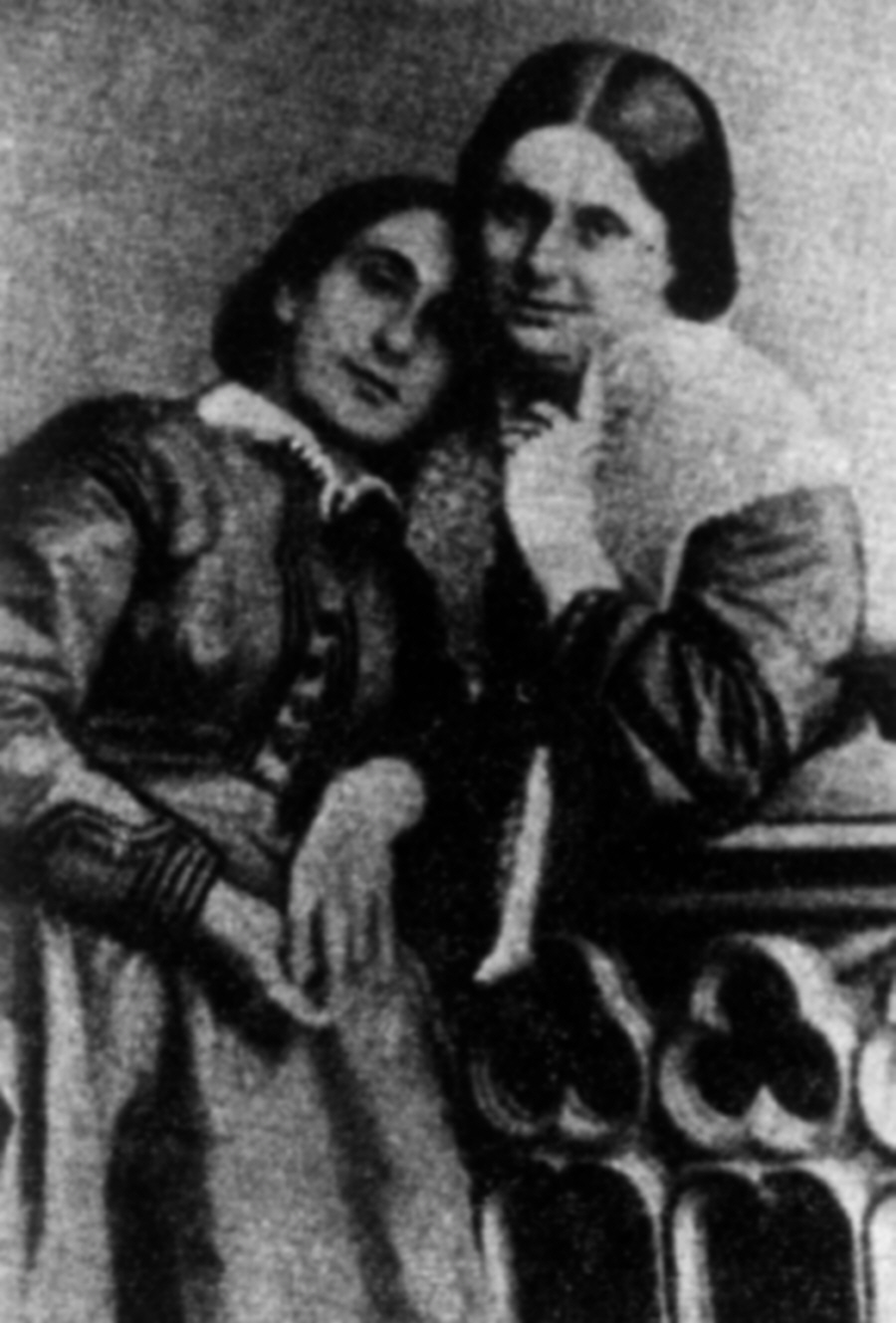
Maria Rosetti (right) and Pia Brătianu

During the 1850s, before and after the 1856 Treaty of Paris allowed her family to return to the Danubian Principalities, Maria Rosetti and her husband invested their energies into support for Partida Naţională, calling for Wallachia's union with Moldavia (effected in 1859 by the election of Alexandru Ioan Cuza as Wallachian Prince, and subsequently Domnitor of the two states). She was a collaborator on C. A. Rosetti's numerous publications, including Românul, before issuing her own weekly magazine, Mama şi Copilul. The latter, which mostly featured advice on educating young children and was motivated by the concern that society had changed after union, was only published between 1865 and 1866. Such activities give Rosetti a claim to the title of Romania's first female journalist, ahead of Maria Flechtenmacher.

Maria Rosetti was subsequently involved in organizing charity events and public ceremonies: in 1866–1867, she raised funds to combat famine, and, in 1871, organized celebrations in the Moldavian locality of Putna. Her prestige increased especially after 1875, when C. A. Rosetti joined the National Liberal Party's leadership. As a journalist, she contributed articles promoting women's liberation. In 1877, as Romania proclaimed its independence and joined the Russian Empire in the anti-Ottoman war, Maria Rosetti rallied funds to aid the wounded, establishing and managing the hospital in Turnu Măgurele.

Maria and C. A. Rosetti had eight children, only four of whom reached adulthood. These were a daughter, Liberty Sofia (commonly known as Libby, born June 1848) and three sons born in exile: Mircea, Vintilă and Horia Rosetti. Her brother was himself a resident of Romania, and married to Zoe, the daughter of Wallachian landowner and politician Alexandru Racoviţă (among their children was the painter Nicolae Grant). Through her brother Effingham, who married into the Racoviţă family, Maria Rosetti was also distantly related with physician Carol Davila and his son, playwright Alexandru Davila.

=== Death ===
Upon her death, a large obituary was published in the National Liberal newspaper Voinţa Naţională, who proclaimed her one of the most outstanding Romanian women of her generation. Her writings of the 1860s were collected in an 1893 volume carrying Michelet's introduction. She is also one of the characters in Camil Petrescu's novel Un om între oameni. A street in central Bucharest, near Bulevardul Magheru, was named in her honour—it constitutes the eastward extension of C. A. Rosetti Street; a school in the Floreasca neighbourhood of the city was also named after her. Several monographs on her life were published during the communist regime years.

== Sources ==
- Irina Livezeanu, June Pachuta Farris (eds.), Women & Gender in Central and Eastern Europe, Russia, and Eurasia: a Comprehensive Bibliography, Volume I: Southeastern and East Central Europe, M. E. Sharpe, Armonk, 2007. ISBN 978-0-7656-0737-9
- Paul Cernovodeanu, "Punţi între două lumi. Britanici printre români", in Magazin Istoric, July 1995
- Ion Frunzetti, Pictorul revoluţionar C.Rosenthal, Editura de Stat pentru Literatură şi Artă, Bucharest, 1955
- Elena Georgescu, "La loc de mare cinste în istoria patriei", in Magazin Istoric, May 1975
