= C. A. Rosetti =

Romanian literary and political leader (1816–1885)

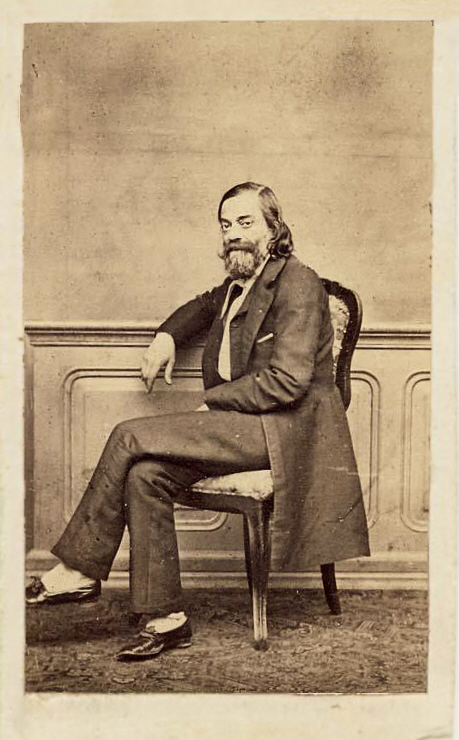
- Born: Constantin Alexandru Rosetti; 2 June 1816; Bucharest, Wallachia
- Died: 8 April 1885 (aged 68); Bucharest, Kingdom of Romania
- Citizenship: Romania
- Occupations: Writer; Journalist; Politician
- Political party: PNL
- Spouse: Maria Rosetti
- Children: Vintilă C. A. Rosetti

Constantin Alexandru Rosetti (Romanian pronunciation: [konstanˈtin alekˈsandru roˈseti]; 2 June 1816 – 8 April 1885) was a Romanian literary and political leader, born in Bucharest into the princely Rosetti family.

== Biography ==
=== Before 1848 ===
Constantin Alexandru Rosetti was born in Bucharest, the son of the ruler Alexandru Rosetti and Elena, maiden name Obedeanu.

He studied at the Saint Sava National College in Bucharest, where his teachers included Eftimie Murgu and Jean Alexandre Vaillant. In 1832 (or 1833), he joined the army and served until August 1836, when he resigned. "He started literature, then entered the administration, being the chief of police in Pitesti in 1842, and then in the magistracy, being a prosecutor at the Civil Court of Bucharest. He resigned in 1845."

In 1844 he left for Paris for the first time: "Then I hoped that working 3–4 years, I would return to my homeland, I would shine full of science and virtues, I would one day made happy at least my mum, I would raise my homeland a little and would die with the thoughts that I have fulfilled my mission beautifully." It is related to other friends and companions: Ion C. Brătianu, painter Constantin Daniel Rosenthal, Vasile Mălinescu, Andronescu, Scarlat Vîrnav. By the end of September (beginning of October), he left the country because he learned that his mother was sick.

After the death of his mother (December 1844), in mid-1845 he left again for Paris, where he attended the courses of historians and thinkers Jules Michelet, Edgar Quinet, and other representatives of the French revolutionary spirit of that time. Here, together with Moldovan Scarlat Vârnav, he tried to rally Wallachian and Moldavian students around new ideas of national self-determination and social justice. In this atmosphere, in December 1845, the Society of Romanian students in Paris was founded, whose first purpose was to help the poorer but gifted young people to study in Paris. The chairman became Ion Ghica, the secretary C. A. Rosetti, and the cashier Scarlat Vârnav.

In 1845, Rosetti went to Paris, where he met Alphonse de Lamartine, the patron of the Society of Romanian Students in Paris. In 1847, he married Mary Grant, the sister of the British consul to Bucharest, Effingham Grant. The consul was married to Zoia Racoviță, the daughter of Alexandru Racoviță; the Grant Bridge (Podul Grant) near Gara de Nord in Bucharest is named after him.

He was initiated in masonry in 1844, in the Masonic lodge "The Rose of the Perfect Silence" in Paris, receiving all grades, up to the 18th degree in 1847, also in this lodge. In 1848, he took part in the establishment of the Bucharest Light House. In 1923, by his name was called a workshop in Bucharest and was one of the few Romanian masons presented in the "Franc-Masonry Dictionary" performed under the coordination of Daniel Ligou.

He returned to Bucharest in July–August 1846, launched into business: he opened, with two foreign friends who lived in Romania, the Austrian economist Erik Winterhalder and the British Effingham Grant (his future brother-in-law), a bookstore, and in November 1846 he bought the printing press and the literary association that covered the activity of the secret society Brotherhood: "The literary association of Romania". In these years, he became very proactive in the management of the Bucharest trade.

In 1847, he married Mary Grant, who became Maria Rosetti, a Scottish-French woman, who was the model of the revolutionary painting "Revolutionary Romania" done by C.D. Rosenthal, Rosetti's friend. Mary Grant was the sister of the English consul in Bucharest, Effingham Grant, who was married to a Romanian, Zoia Racoviță, the daughter of Alexandru Racoviță.

=== The revolution of 1848 and exile ===
During the revolution of 1848, he was one of the leaders of the radical current of the revolutionaries; he was secretary of the provisional Government, prefect of police (agă) in Bucharest and editor of the newspaper "Pruncul român" ("Romanian baby").

After the defeat of the revolutionary government, he took part in the first batch of exiles, escorted by Turks with two rafts down the Danube, to the border with Austria. From here it left for France through Hungary, Croatia, and Austria. He arrived in Paris in December 1848. In the years of exile (1848–1857), he contributed to the publication of the magazine "Future Romania" and especially of the magazine "The Romanian Republic", in which he campaigned for the unification of the principalities in a democratic state.

Rosetti took part in the Wallachian Revolution of 1848. He was among the first arrested by Prince Gheorghe Bibescu, who accused Rosetti of plotting to kill him. After the provisional government came to power on 11 June 1848, he held the post of chief of police. He was also the editor of the first newspaper of the Muntenian revolution, Pruncul Român. He served with Nicolae Bălcescu, Alexandru G. Golescu, and Ion C. Brătianu as a secretary of the Provisional Government until the end of June. In August, he was appointed director of the Ministry of the Interior.

After the bloody crushing of the revolution on 13 September 1848, Rosetti was arrested along with the other leaders of the revolution. His wife's intervention was crucial in their release. Rosetti, along with the Brătianu brothers, Bălcescu, and others, went into exile in France. While in France, he published a review favouring the creation of a national unitary state.

=== Activity after his return to the country (1857) ===
In May 1857, he returned to the country. On this occasion, the Romanian Israeli newspaper published the edition no. 7/19 June 1857, under the title Rusciuk, 11/25 May 1857, a letter from C. A. Rosetti, from which it turns out that on his return from this exile entered the country with an Ottoman embassy passport and with the help of Jews circles. After returning to the country, he edited the liberal-radical newspaper "Romanul" and played an important role in the ad hoc Assembly and in the election of Alexandru Ioan Cuza as ruler also of the Romanian Country. In the pages of the newspaper "Romanul", which appeared for almost half a century, he advocated for democratic reforms, for national unity, for the country's national independence.

He was one of the leaders of the National Liberal Party, established in 1874–1875, but in 1884, after entering into conflict with Ion Brătianu, he organized a liberal dissent. He enthusiastically supported the proclamation of the country's independence and Romania's participation in the Russian-Turkish war of 1877–1878. In 1858, he founded and chaired the "Association of Printing Workers in Bucharest". In 1863 he founded the House of Mutual Help of the Romanian printers together with Walter Scarlat, Iosif Romanov, Zisu Popa, Mihalache Gălășescu, and Petre Ispirescu.

In 1861, he returned to Romania and was elected deputy, and in 1866 was minister of public instruction. Between 15 and 16 July 1866, he was the temporary Prime Minister of the United Principalities of Romania.

He was on several occasions a minister and president of the Chamber of Deputies. He was part of the Charles I first government and for several months was a minister of "Public Instruction and Religious Affairs". He was twice mayor of the Capital. In memory of the Romanian revolutionary, in Bucharest there is a C. A. Rosetti Square (Piața Rosetti), where his monument, topped by a bronze statue, stands.

His literature promotes romantic adventures, a pathetic and vibrant style. In his youth, he wrote sentimental and patriotic lyrics, translated from Byron, Béranger, Lamartine, and Hugo.

In 1867, C. A. Rosetti was one of the founding members of the Romanian Literary Society, which later became the Romanian Academy.

He was also a member of the Macedo-Romanian Cultural Society.

He supported the deposition of Alexandru Ioan Cuza in 1866. He headed the Chamber of Deputies in 1877 and was Minister of the Interior between 1881 and 1882.

== Legacy ==
A street (Strada C. A. Rosetti) and a square (Piața Rosetti) in downtown Bucharest are named after him, as is a high school.

== Gallery ==
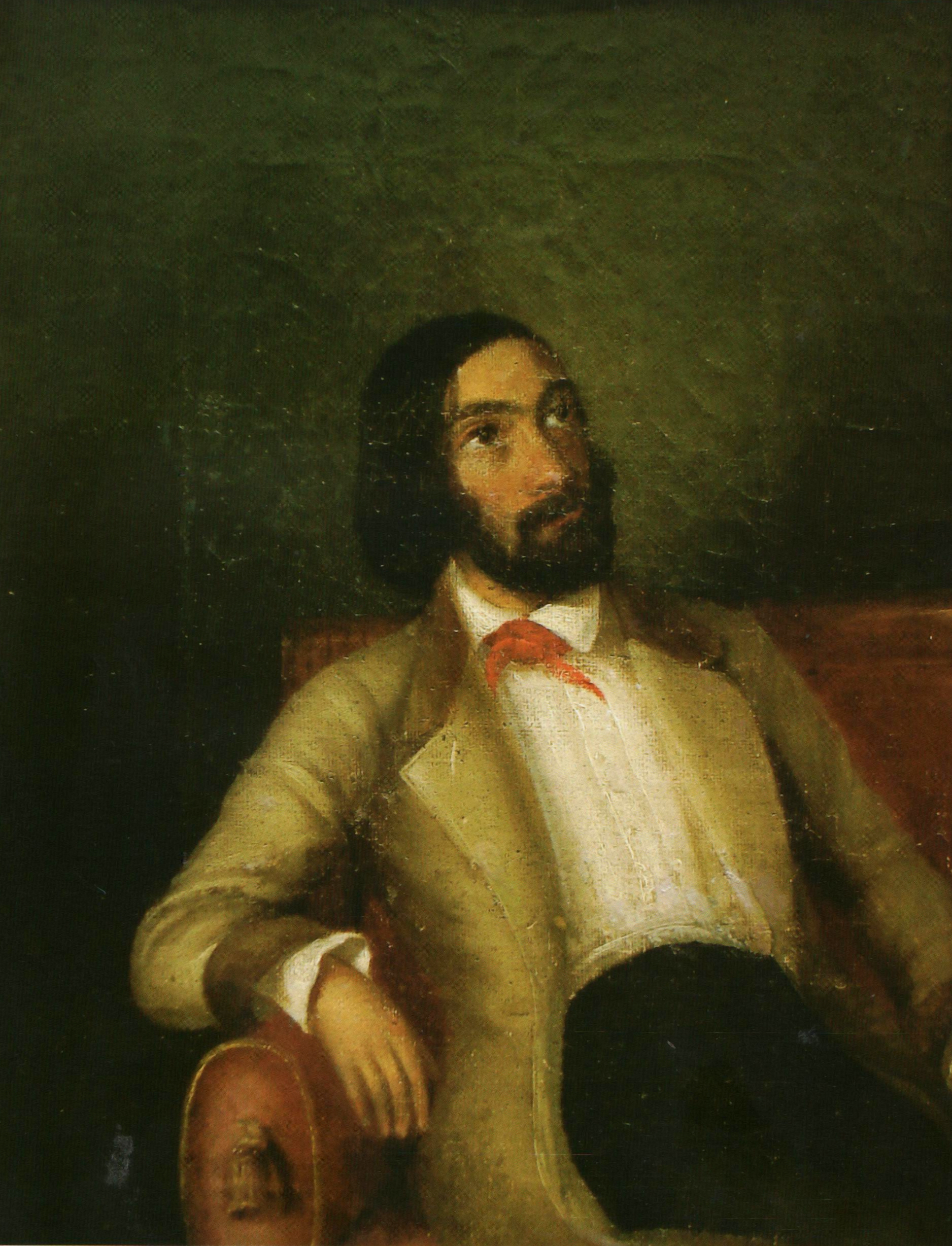
Portrait by Constantin Daniel Rosenthal

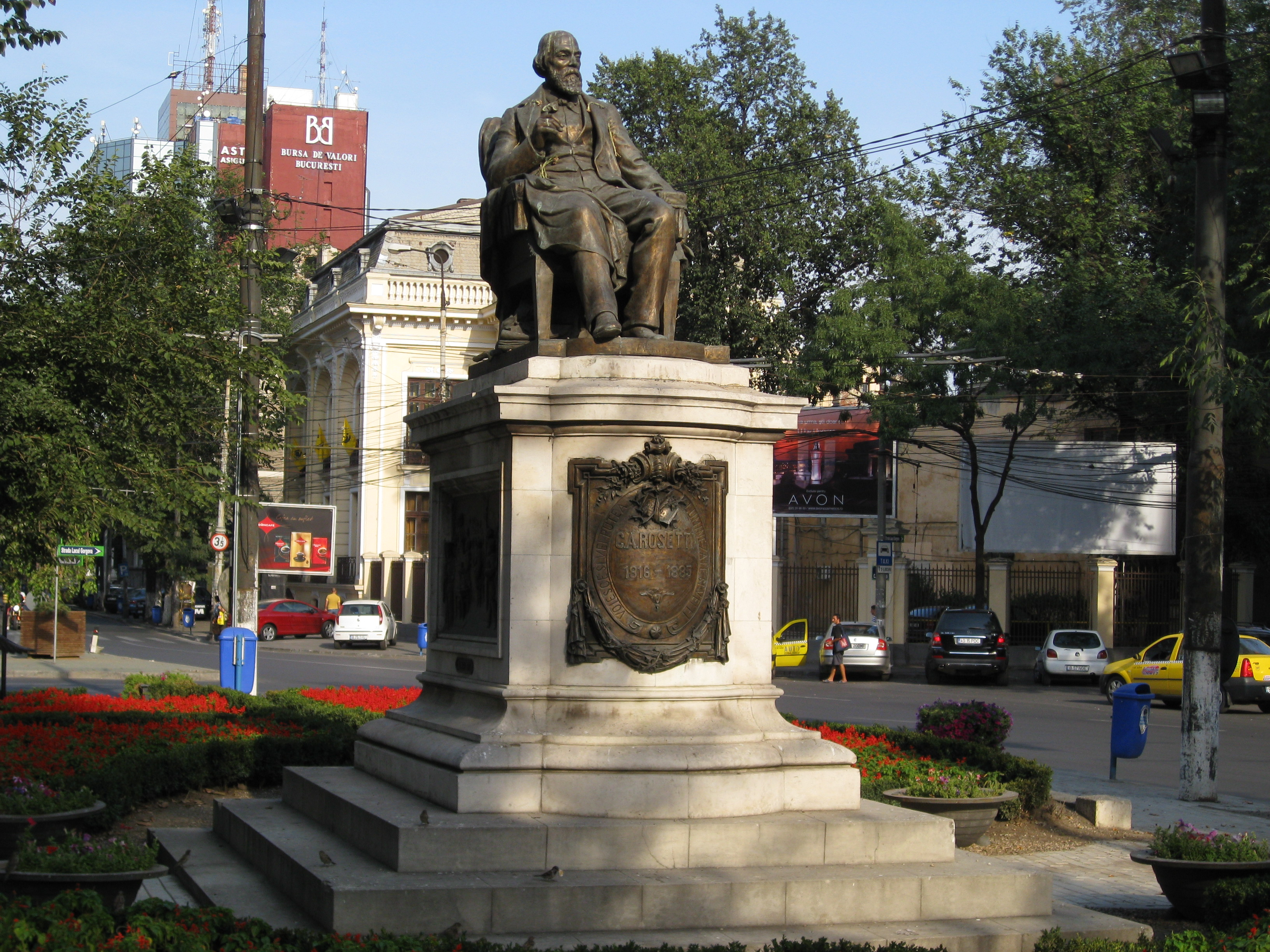
Sculpture of Rosetti, in the centre of the eponymous square
