= Stadionul Giulești-Valentin Stănescu (1939) =

Football stadium in Romania

Giulești-Valentin Stănescu
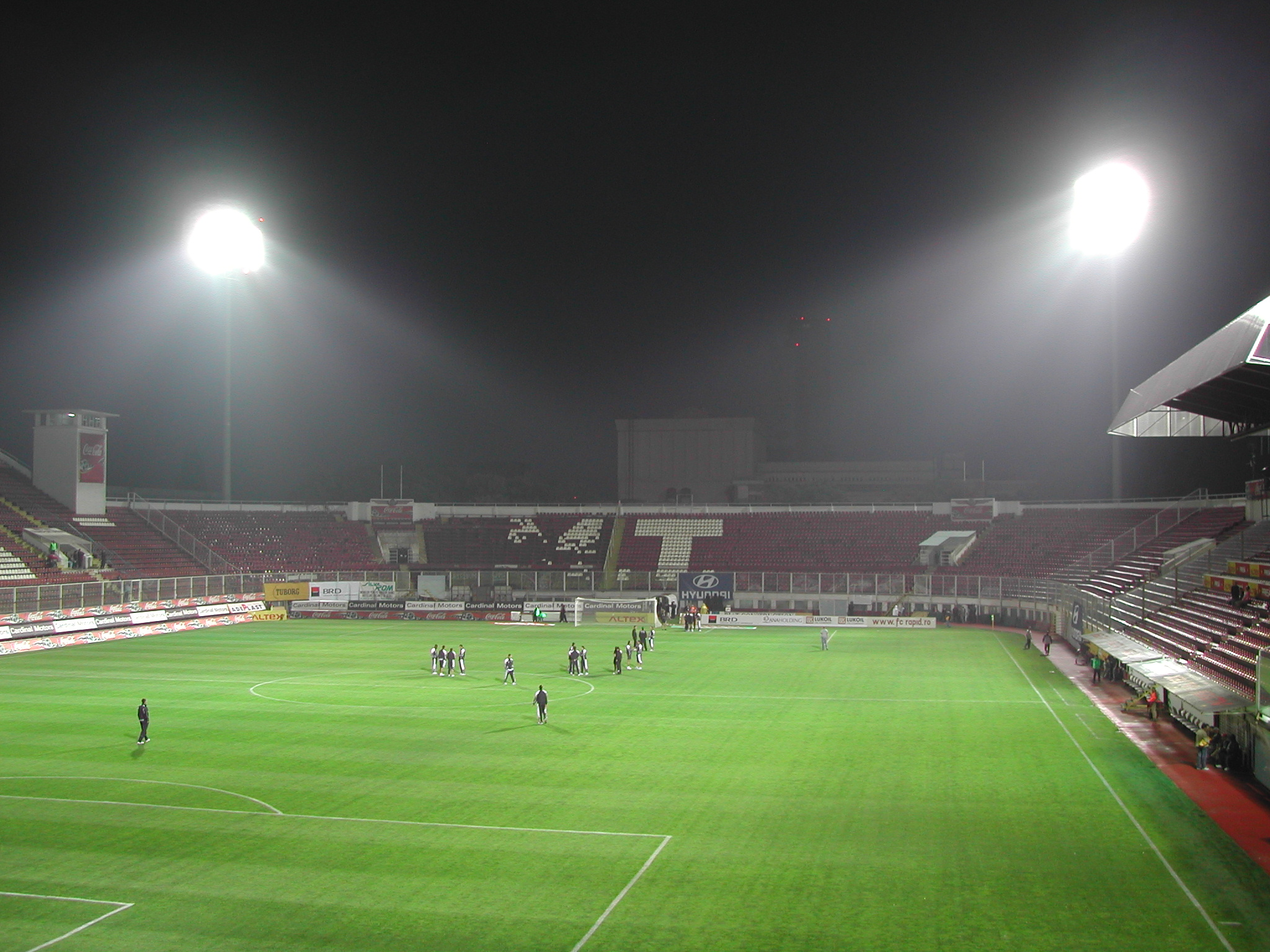
- Interactive map of Giulești-Valentin Stănescu
- Former names: Stadionul Giulești
- Address: 18 Calea Giulești
- Location: Bucharest, Romania
- Coordinates: 44°27′21.3″N 26°3′24.6″E
- Owner: Ministry of Transport
- Capacity: 19,100 seated
- Surface: Grass
- Field size: 102 x 68m

Construction
- Opened: 10 June 1939
- Renovated: 2003
- Expanded: 1996
- Closed: 24 November 2018
- Demolished: 10 January 2019

Tenants
- Rapid București (1939–2018); Sportul Studențesc (2013)

Giulești-Valentin Stănescu Stadium was a football stadium in Bucharest, Romania. It was the home stadium of FC Rapid București for almost 80 years.

It was named after Valentin Stănescu, the coach that helped Rapid to win its first title, but was most commonly known as the "Giulești Stadium", after the name of the neighborhood in which it was located. Landmarks near the stadium include Podul Grant, Giulești Theatre and Prunaru market. Gara de Nord is not far away from the stadium and the Grivița Railway Yards are right next to it.

The stadium was entirely demolished in 2019, and has been replaced with the Rapid Arena, a new all-seater stadium that opened in 2022.

== History ==
Construction started in the 1936 and the stadium was inaugurated on 10 June 1939. At the time, it was the most modern stadium in Romania, a smaller replica of Arsenal's Highbury Stadium, with a capacity of 12,160 seats. Among the guests at the opening ceremony were King Carol II of Romania, Prince Mihai of Romania and Prince Paul of Greece. It was noted for its Art Deco architecture and quickly became a symbol of the working-class Giulești neighborhood. It escaped systematization attempts from 1975 to 1990.

Replacement of the north stand was completed in the mid-1990s, increasing the capacity to 19,100 seats. The stadium was renovated again in 2003.

Since the summer of 2004, the stadium had been administered by Rapid București. Its capacity was restricted to 11,704 seats due to safety concerns regarding parts of the stadium.

On 24 November 2018 the stadium was closed for demolition, with a new ground planned to take its place. The last match played in the Giulești Stadium was between FC Rapid București and Înainte Modelu, which Rapid won 1-0.

On 10 January 2019 the demolition process began. It was completed on 7 May 2019.

== Romania national football team ==
The following national team matches were held in the stadium:

#	Date	Score	Opponent	Competition
1.	28 April 2004	5–1	Germany	Friendly match
2.	4 September 2004	2–1	Finland	2006 FIFA World Cup qualification
3.	26 March 2005	0–2	Netherlands	2006 FIFA World Cup qualification
4.	3 June 2011	3–0	Bosnia and Herzegovina	UEFA Euro 2012 qualifying

== Gallery ==
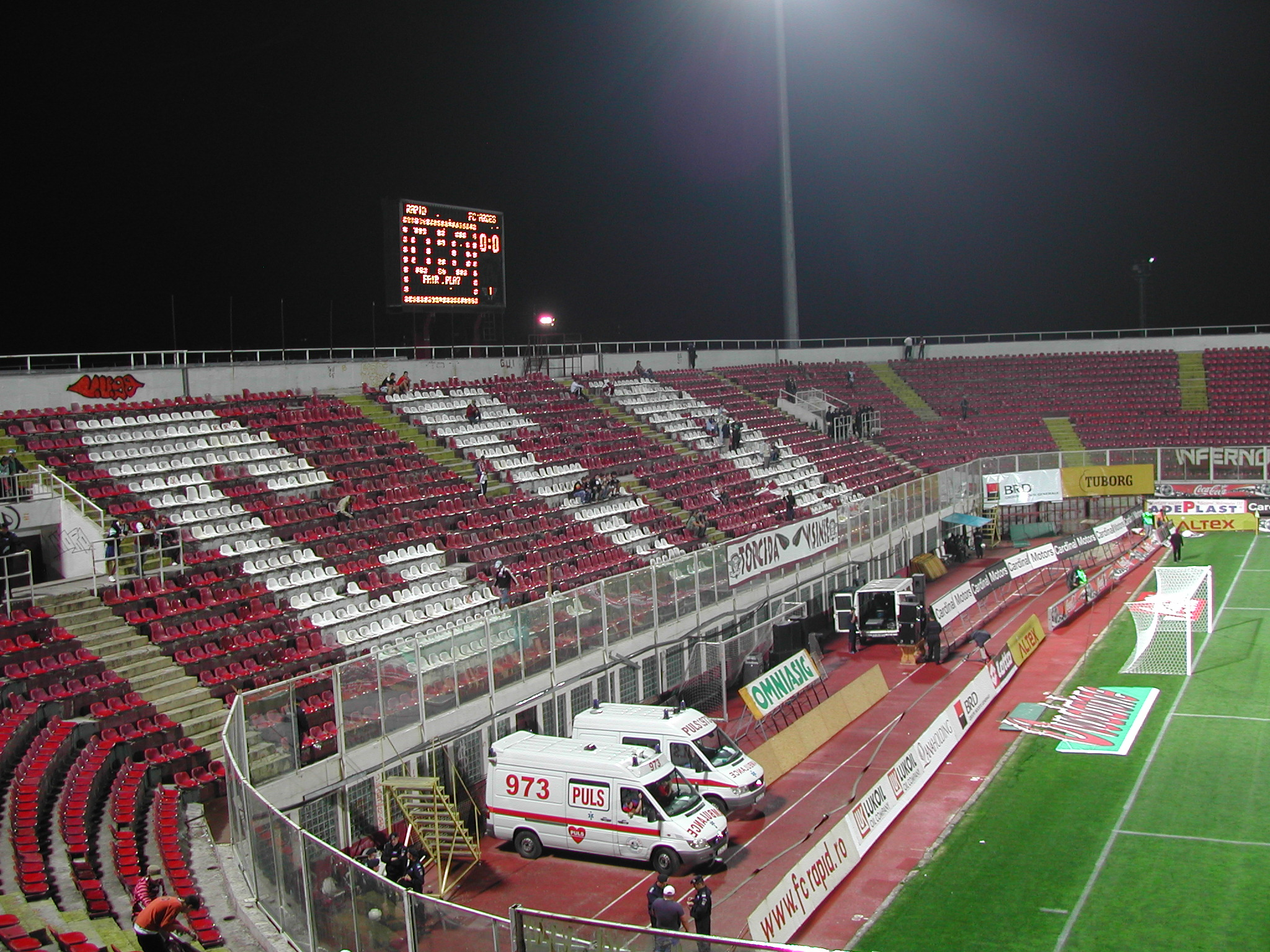
View of the North End from the Main Stand

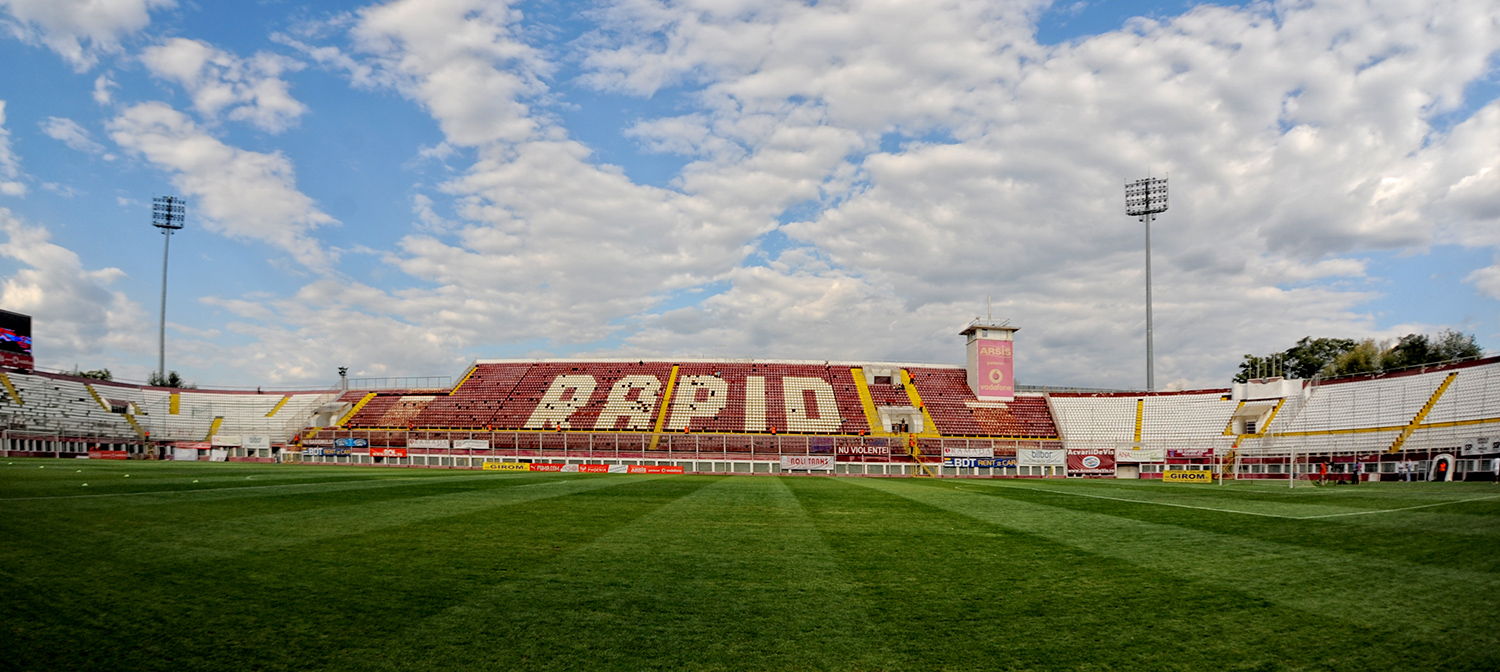
View of the Second Stand from the Main Stand

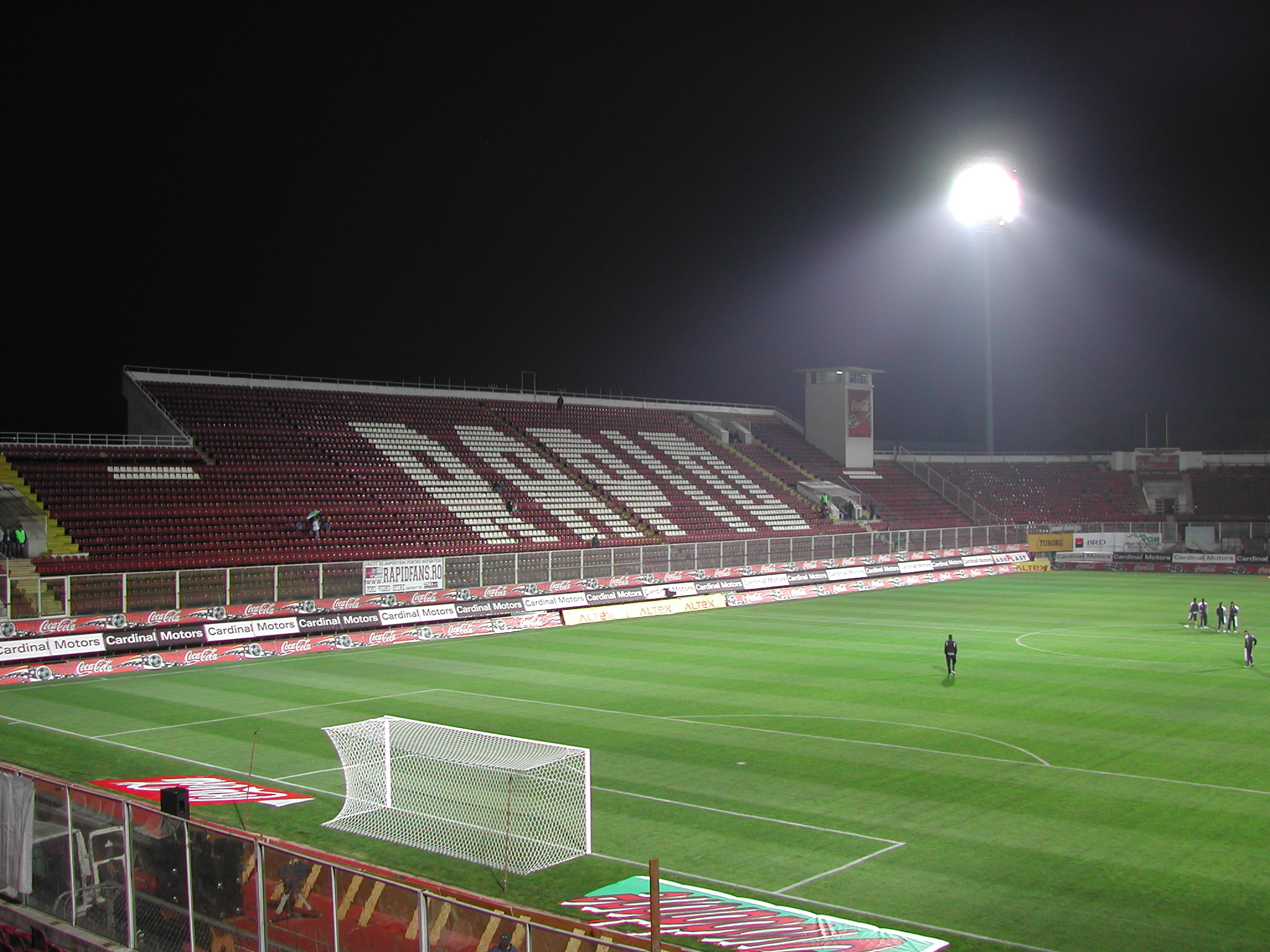
View of the Second Stand from the North End

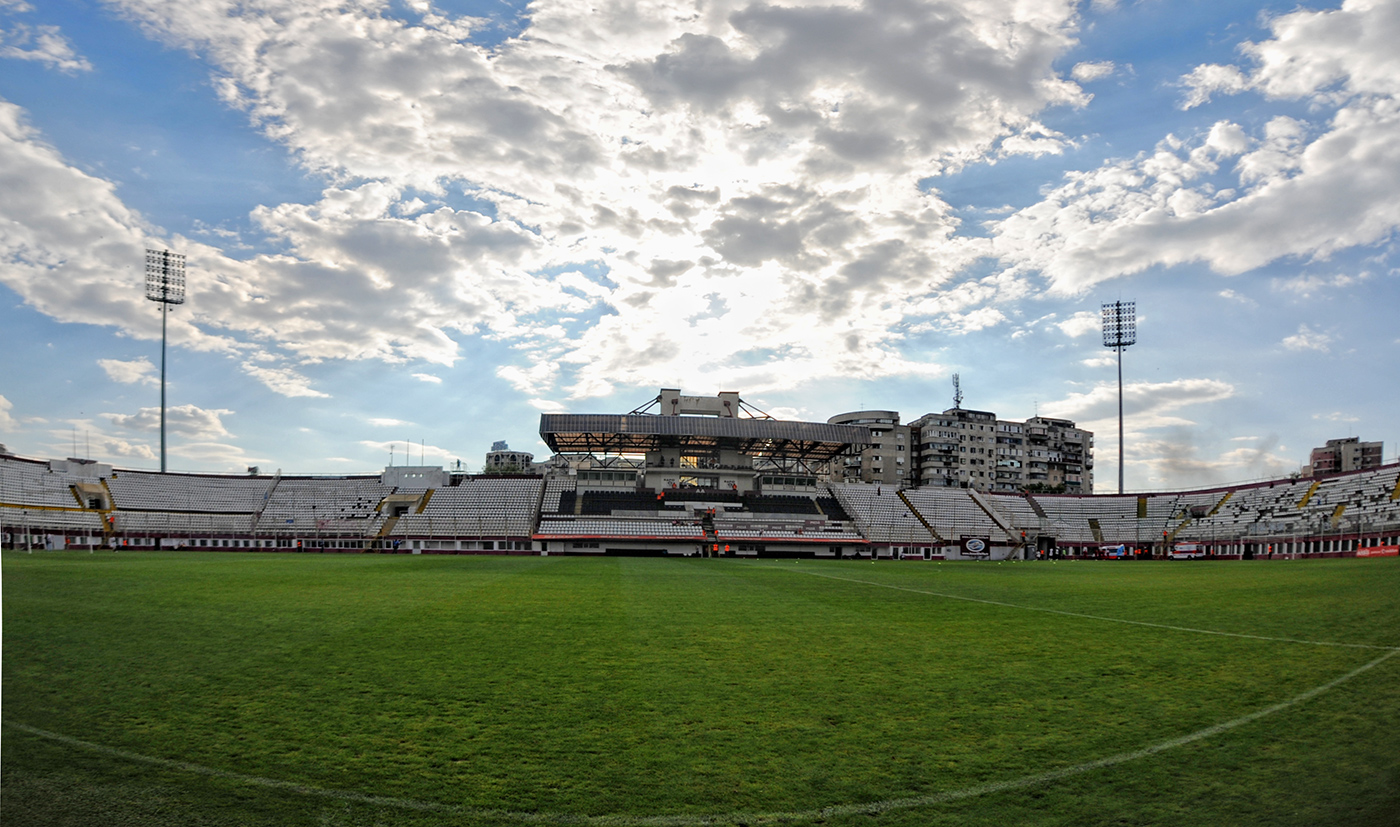
View of the Main Stand from the Second Stand

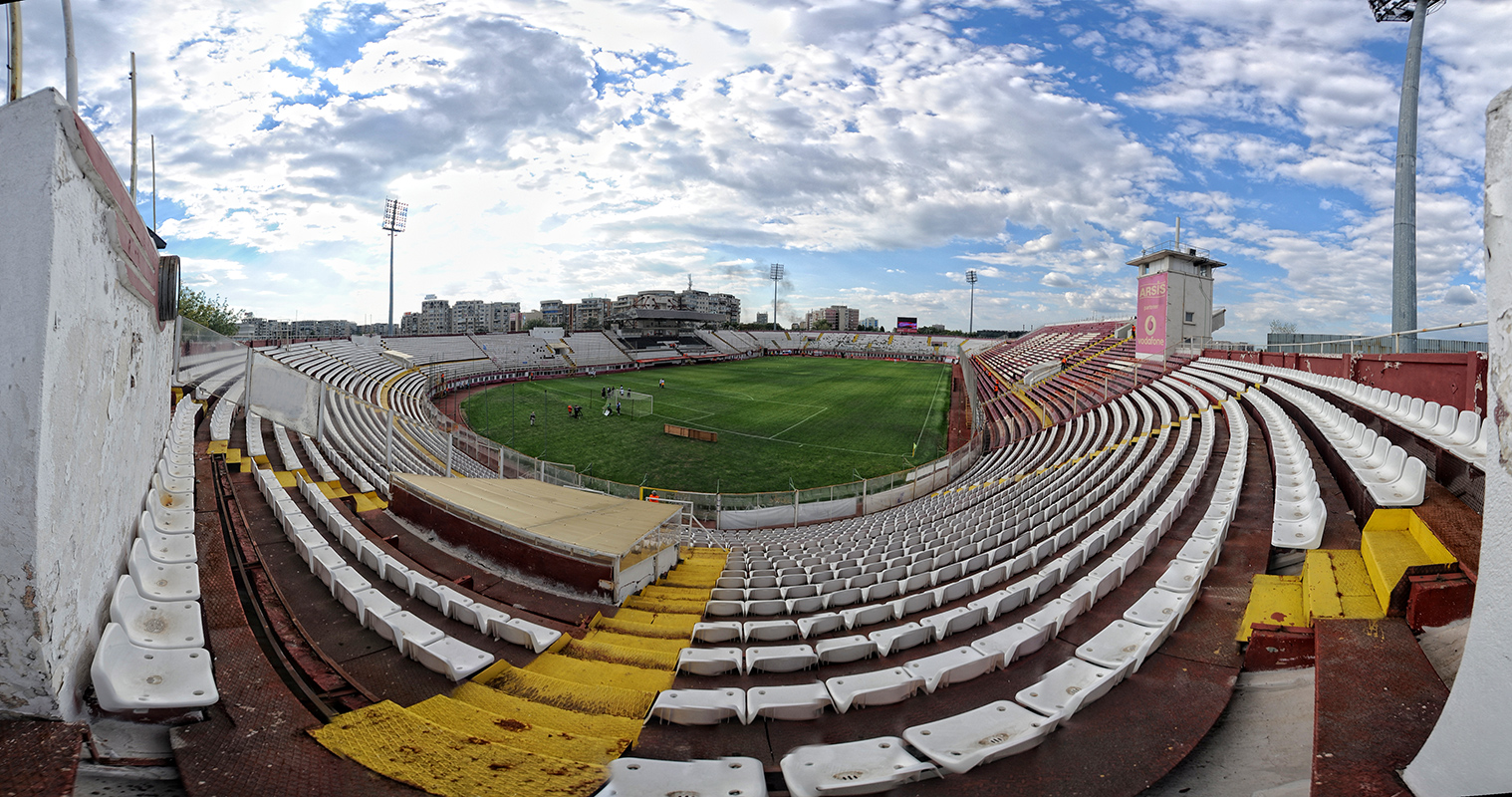
View of the stadium from the South End

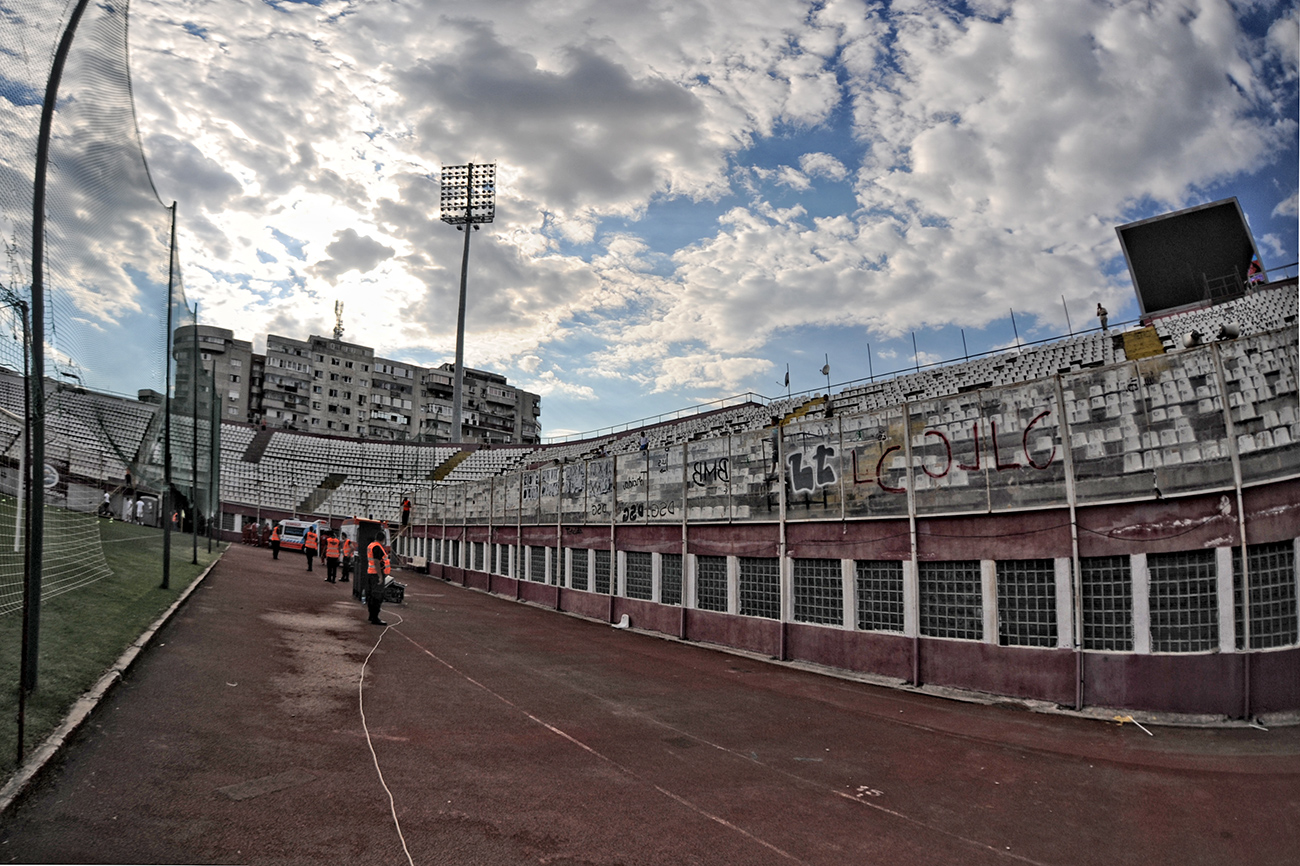
North End in 2012.

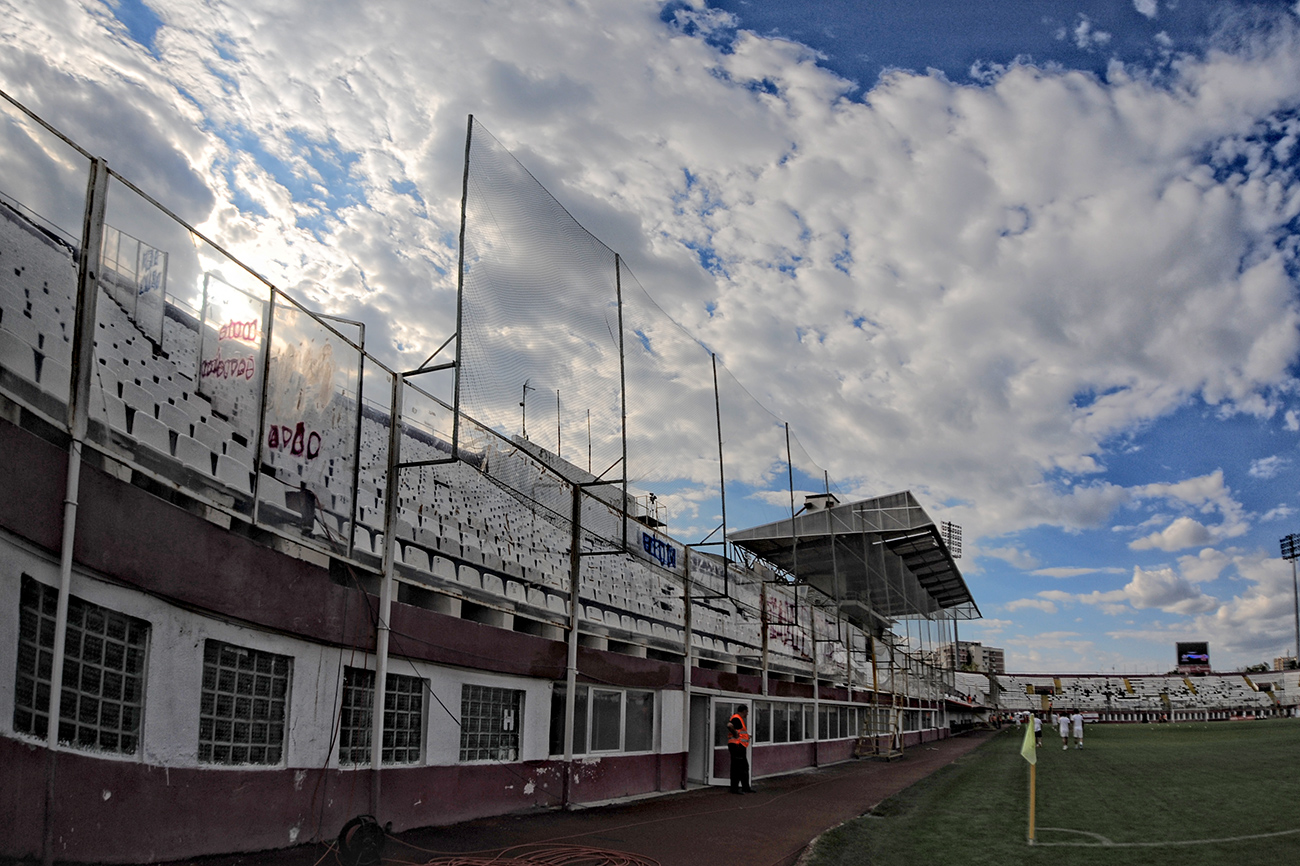
Main Stand in 2012.

== See also ==
- List of football stadiums in Romania
