= Piața Rosetti =

Coordinates: 44.43628°N 26.10655°E

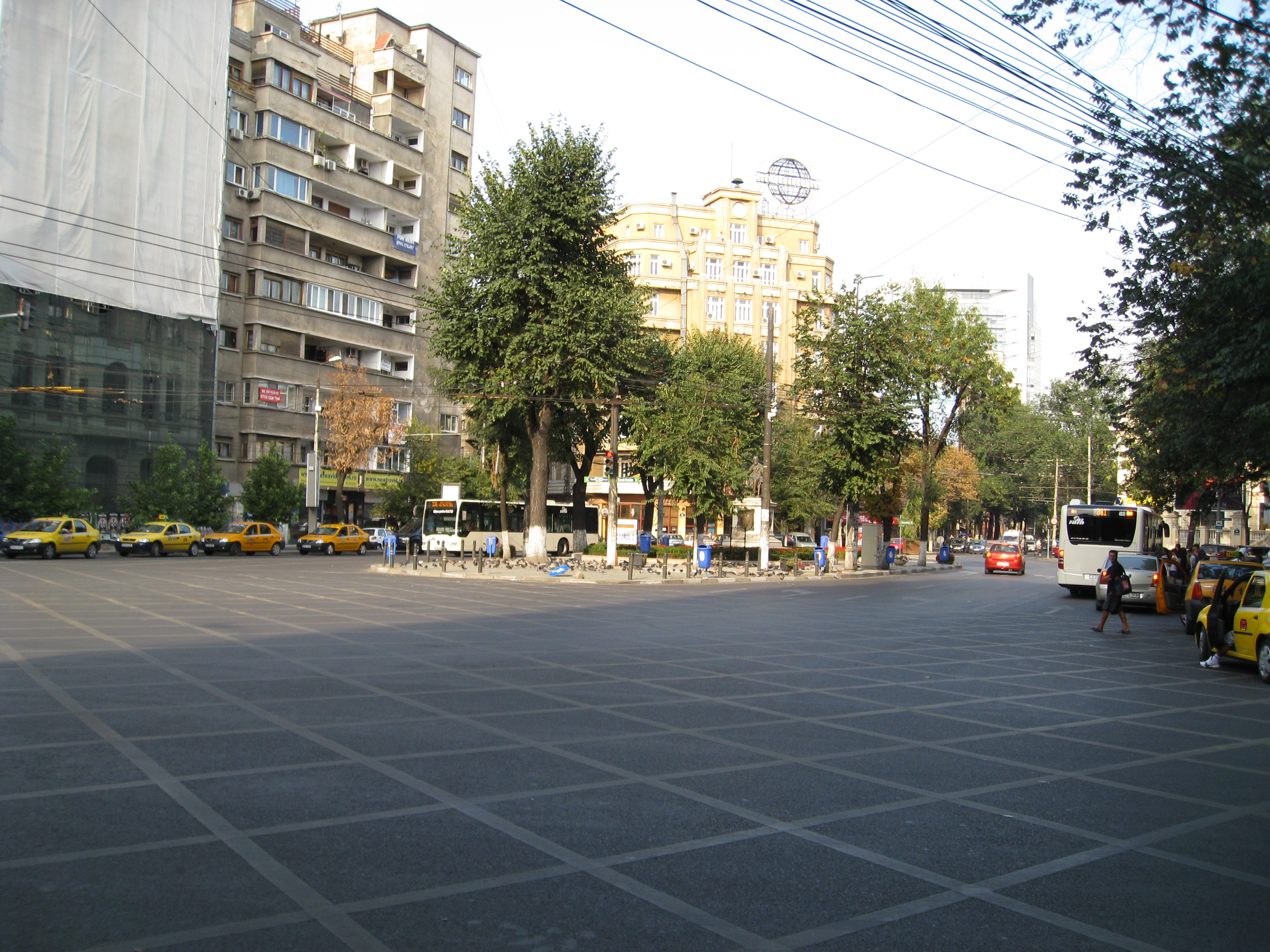
Piața Rosetti

Piața Rosetti is a small square in Sector 2 of Bucharest, 250 metres from Piața Universității. It lies at the intersection of Carol I Boulevard, Hristo Botev Boulevard, Tudor Arghezi Street, Vasile Lascăr Street, Dianei Street, and Radu Cristian Street.

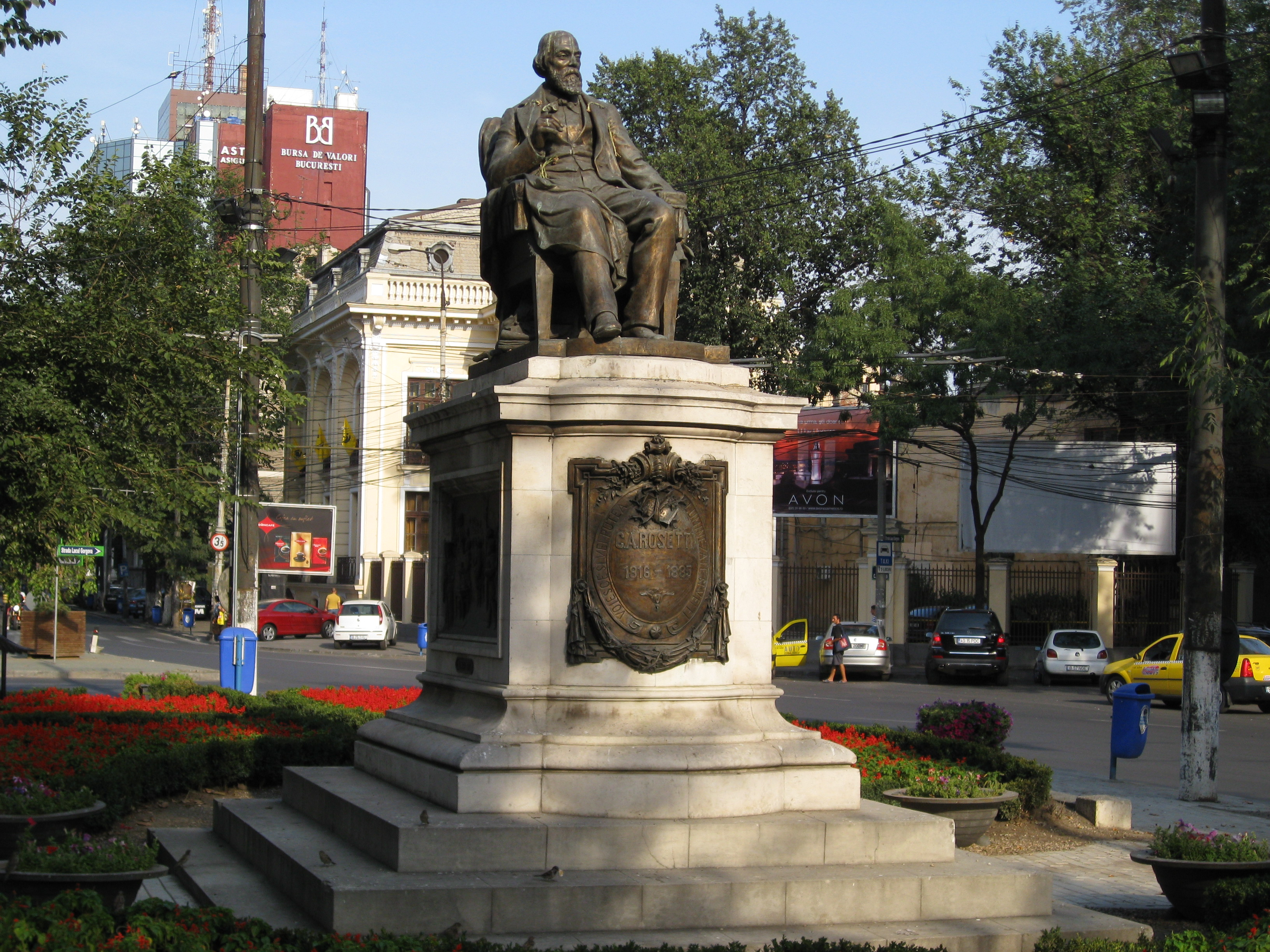
Statue of C. A. Rosetti, in the centre of the square

The square is named after former mayor of Bucharest, Romanian statesman, and 1848 revolutionary C. A. Rosetti. It was designed as part of the modernisation efforts of ex-mayor Pache Protopopescu in 1888. A bronze statue of Rosetti adorns the square; the statue, due to Wladimir Hegel, was inaugurated in 1903.

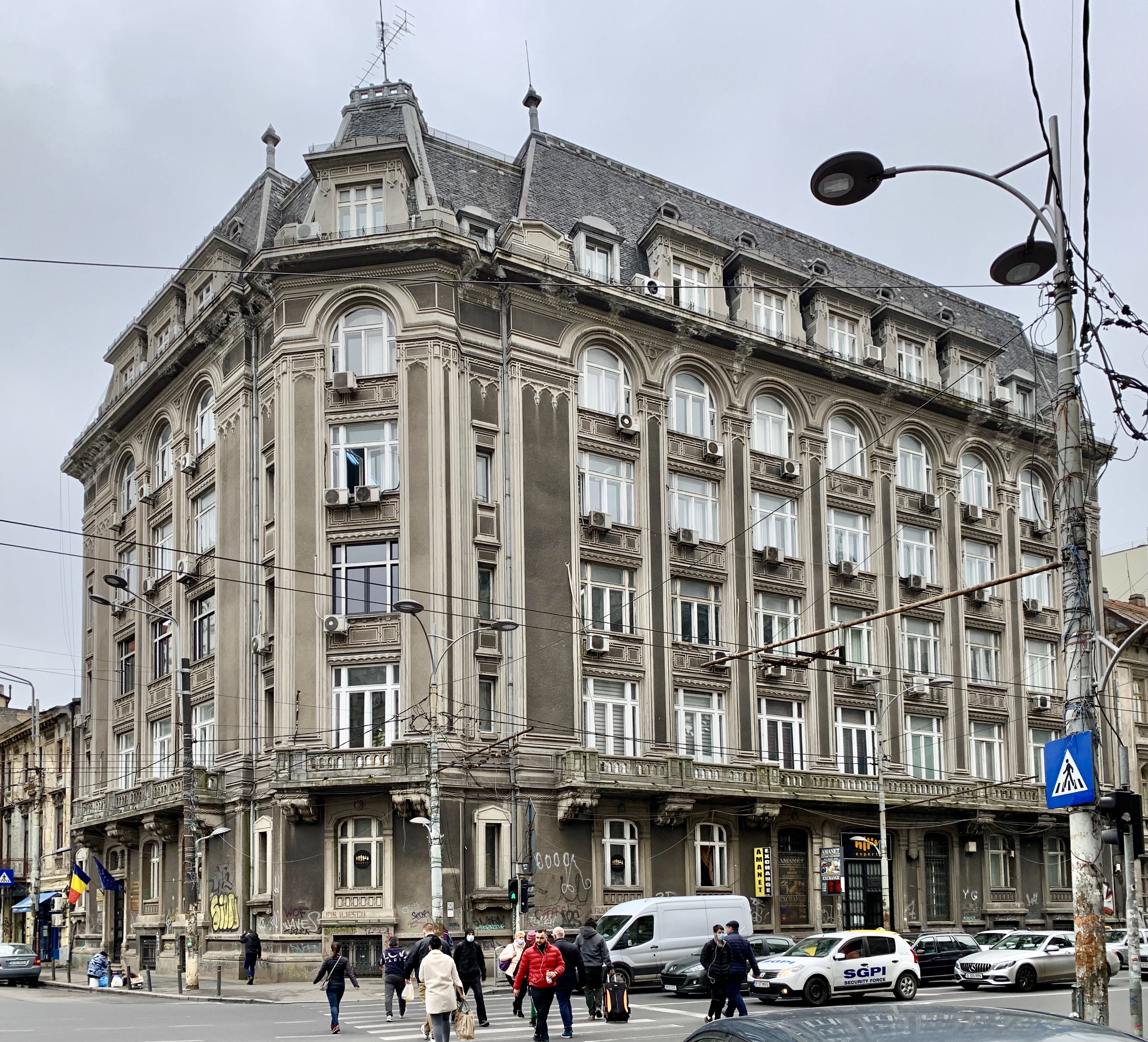
The Astra building, at the western edge of the square

The Astra building is a historic monument located at the intersection of Carol I and Hristo Botev Boulevards, overlooking Rosetti Square.
