= Constantin Daniel Rosenthal =

Austrian painter (1820–1851)

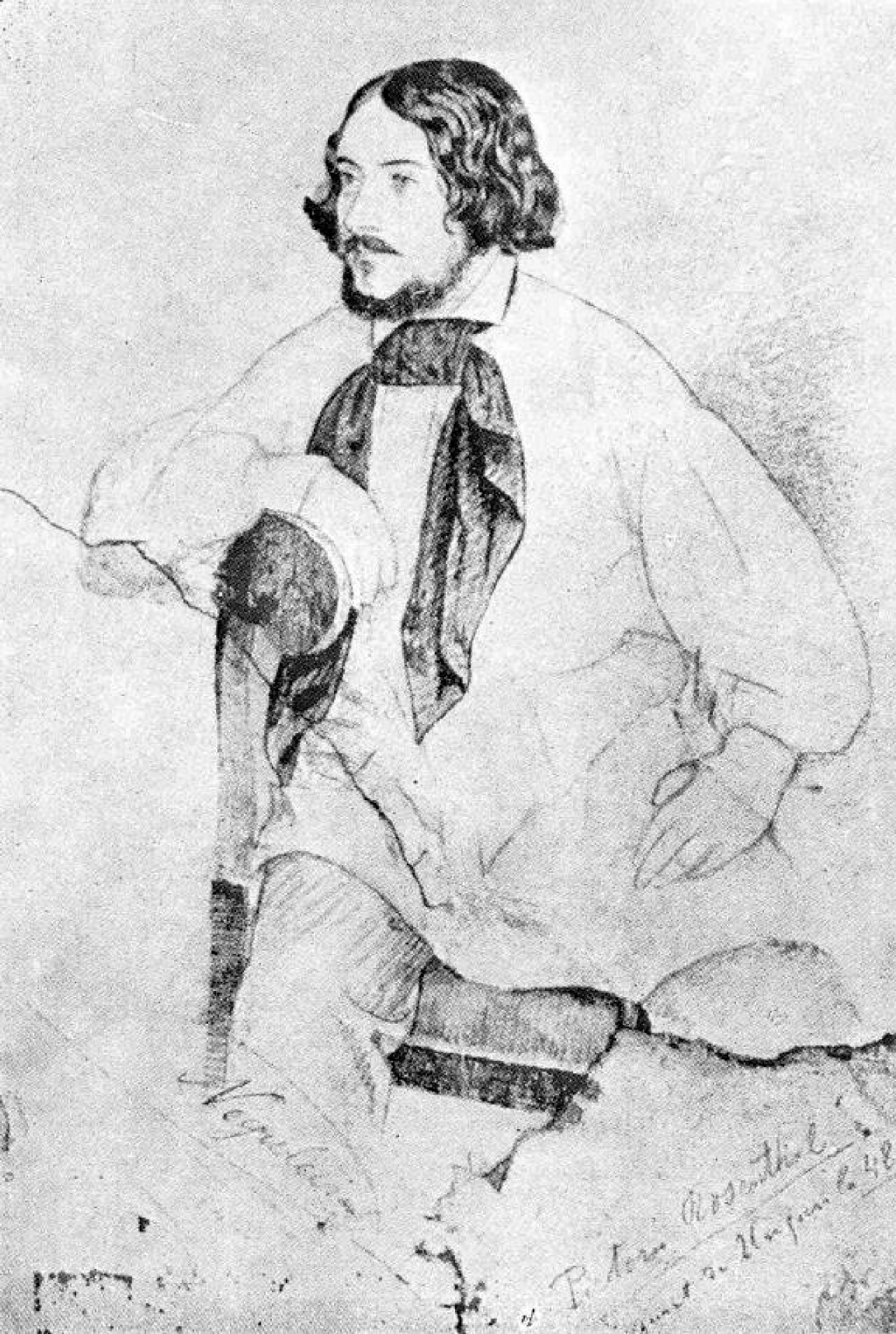
- Portrait of Rosenthal by Ion Negulici
- Born: Rosenthal David c. 1820; Pest, Austrian Empire
- Died: July 22, 1851; Pest, Austrian Empire
- Known for: painting
- Movement: Romanticism

Constantin Daniel Rosenthal (b.Rosenthal David, 1820 – July 23, 1851) was a painter and sculptor of Austrian birth and a Romanian 1848 revolutionary, best known for his portraits and his choice of Romanian Romantic nationalist subjects.

== Biography ==
=== Early career ===
Born into a Jewish merchant family in Pest (part of the Austrian Empire at the time), he left the city at the age of seventeen in order to attend the Vienna Academy of Fine Arts, where he studied archaeological drawing (graduating in 1839) and made his first Romanian acquaintance, the painter Ioan D. Negulici.

Rosenthal arrived in Bucharest, the capital of Wallachia, around 1842, where he was probably commissioned to paint the first in a long series of boyar's portraits. He was introduced to the liberal-radical circles by Negulici, becoming very close to C. A. Rosetti.

Dissatisfied with his oil painting technique, he left for France in late 1844, he attended art courses in Paris, and began attending meetings of Wallachian and Moldavian students who expressed nationalist and radical ideals. He was accompanied by Rosetti, who praised Rosenthal's work ethic:

"There are many Romanians here [but] none of them have to bear the cold Rosenthal has to [in his lodging]. Strange how the noble aim enpowers... there truly are plenty elloquent proofs that the man shall become great!".

This is the most likely date of his multiple portrait, kept only in its lithograph rendition, showing Rosetti embracing Rosenthal himself and a third, unknown person. Rosenthal painted himself wearing a phrygian cap.

=== Wallachian revolution ===
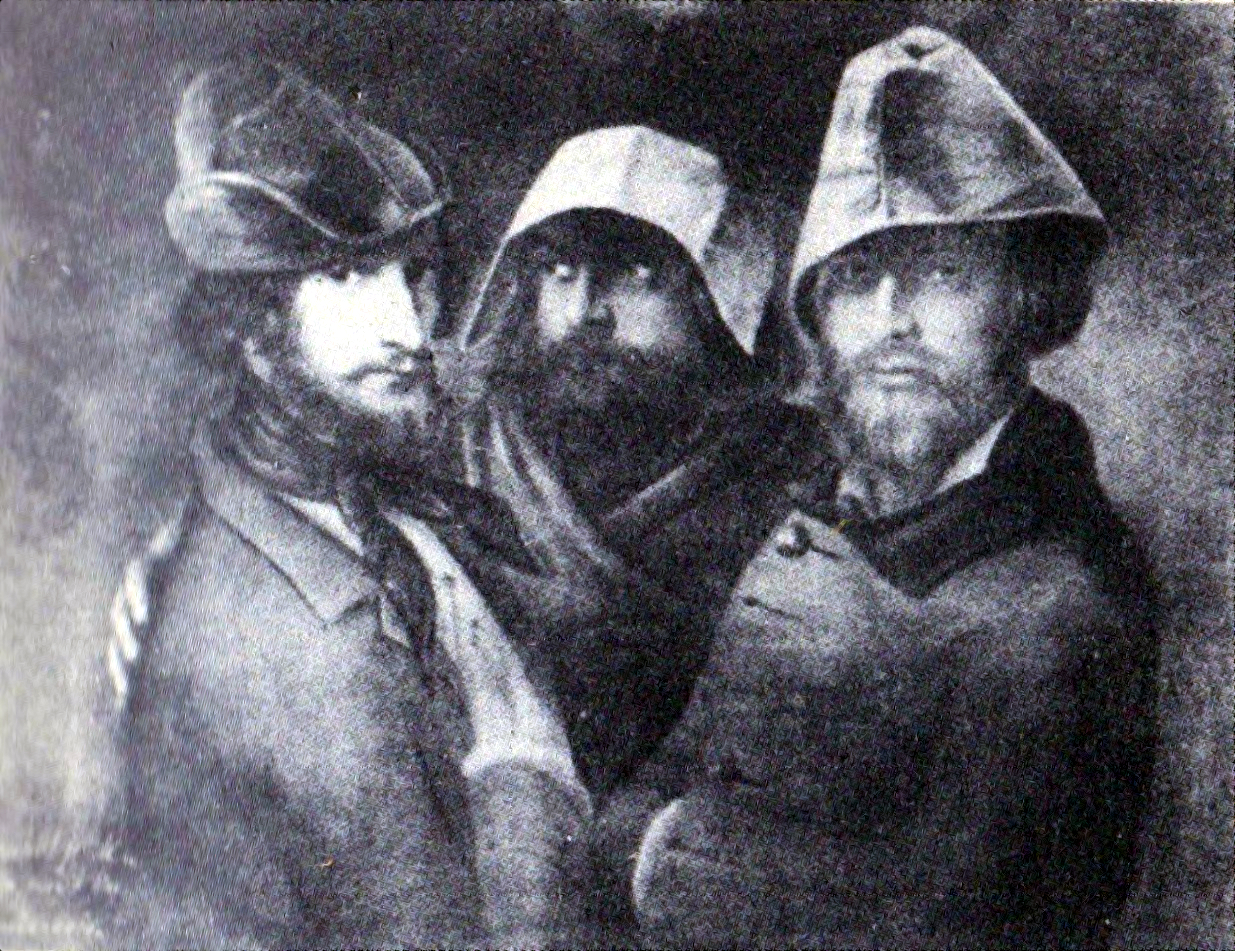
Lithograph of a group portrait by Rosenthal. From left: Rosenthal (wearing a phrygian cap), C. A. Rosetti, and an unknown revolutionary

In 1846, the profit from his works afforded him a trip to England; upon his return to Paris, he was informed of his family's financial destitution, and left for Budapest in early 1847, only to leave in summer for Mehadia, and then, in August, for Bucharest. Rosenthal again joined the radical circles, this time as a member of the secret society Frăţia, which was by then masking itself as a literary society presided by Iancu Văcărescu, and was commissioned by Vasile Alecsandri to paint a portrait of the deceased Elena Negri after a daguerreotype. He also painted the portrait of Anica Manu, the wife of Aga Iancu Manu.

Upon the outbreak of the revolution, Rosenthal was spared the first wave of repression ordered by Prince Gheorghe Bibescu – given the fact that he carried an Austrian passport. On June 18, 1848, soon after the Provisional Government took hold, Rosenthal applied for Wallachian citizenship (in theory, Romanian – as the new administrative body indicated its goal in the union of the two Danubian Principalities); the document giving him the right of naturalization justified it as "taking in view his talent and the active part he played in the revolution". In his correspondence with Rosetti, he later testified: "I never would have thought that I could be as Wallachian as I am now".

The Government assigned him the designing of a triumphal arch in Bucharest, one meant to mark the success of the revolution, and, probably, of a Statue of Liberty (the latter project only survives in a watercolour by Theodor Aman, Dezrobirea Ţiganilor - "The Freeing of the Gypsies").

=== Exile ===
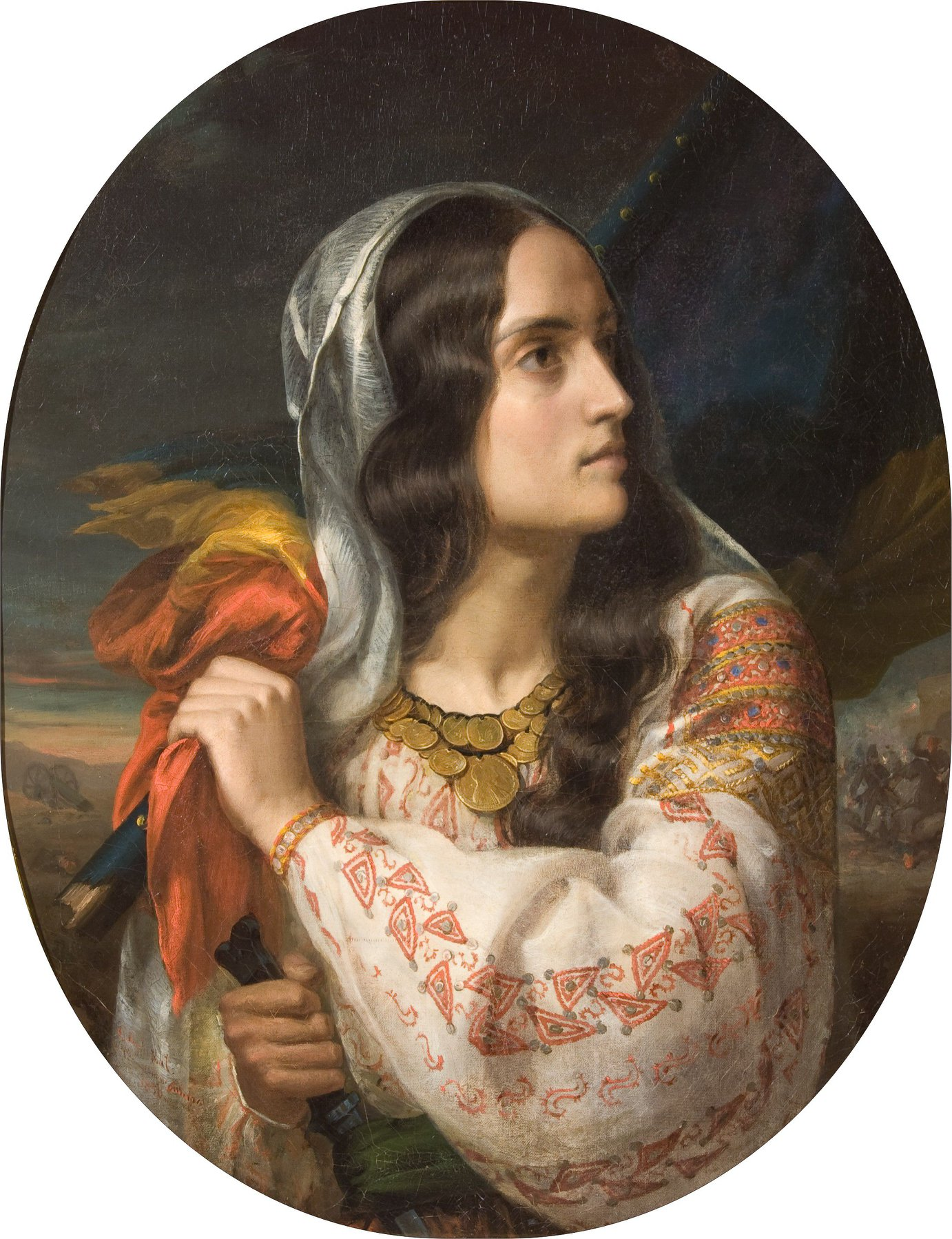
Revolutionary Romania (portrait of Maria Rosetti)

In late September, after Ottoman troops intervened against the revolution, most radicals were arrested and transported on board small vessels on the Danube, to exile in various locations. Rosenthal made public his request to join them, but was answered that Austrian protection still applied to him, and, although he requested to be viewed as a Wallachian, was denied permission to board. Subsequently, he and Rosetti's wife Maria followed the ships on shore from Giurgiu to Sviniţa, where they convinced the Austrian mayor to disarm the Ottoman guards, and allow the prisoners to go free.

He returned to Pest-Buda, which was still witnessing the Hungarian revolution at the time, left for Paris in May 1850, and subsequently joined Romanian exiles in carrying out propaganda work. His most celebrated paintings, two national personifications – România revoluţionară ("Revolutionary Romania", which was also a portrait of Maria Rosetti) and România rupându-şi cătuşele pe Câmpia Libertăţii ("Romania Breaking off Her Chains on the Field of Liberty") – date from this period.

=== Persecution and killing ===
Soon without money, Rosenthal left for Switzerland, and lived for a while in late 1850 in the town of Porrentruy, before leaving for Fribourg, then Chur, in the first days of 1851. In Graz until July, where he began receiving some attention from critics, he decided to return to Wallachia in an attempt to rekindle the radical movement.

His plan was divulged by spies of the Second French Republic (already under the authority of Prince-President Louis-Napoléon Bonaparte), who read Rosenthal's correspondence in Paris; the Austrians arrested the painter during his presence in Pest-Buda, citing his "imprudent political statements". Pressured to reveal his connections and refusing to comply, Rosenthal was tortured to death; his body was never returned to his family.

In 1878, Maria Rosetti wrote a piece for Mama şi Copilul magazine, in which she praised her deceased friend:

"[Rosenthal was] one of the best and the most loyal people that God created after His image. He died for Romania, for its liberties; he died for his Romanian friends. [...] This friend, this son, this martyr of Romania is an Israelite. His name was Daniel Rosenthal."

== Gallery ==
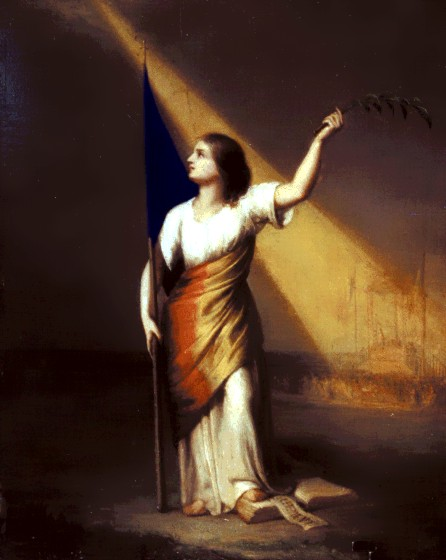
Romania Breaking off Her Chains on the Field of Liberty

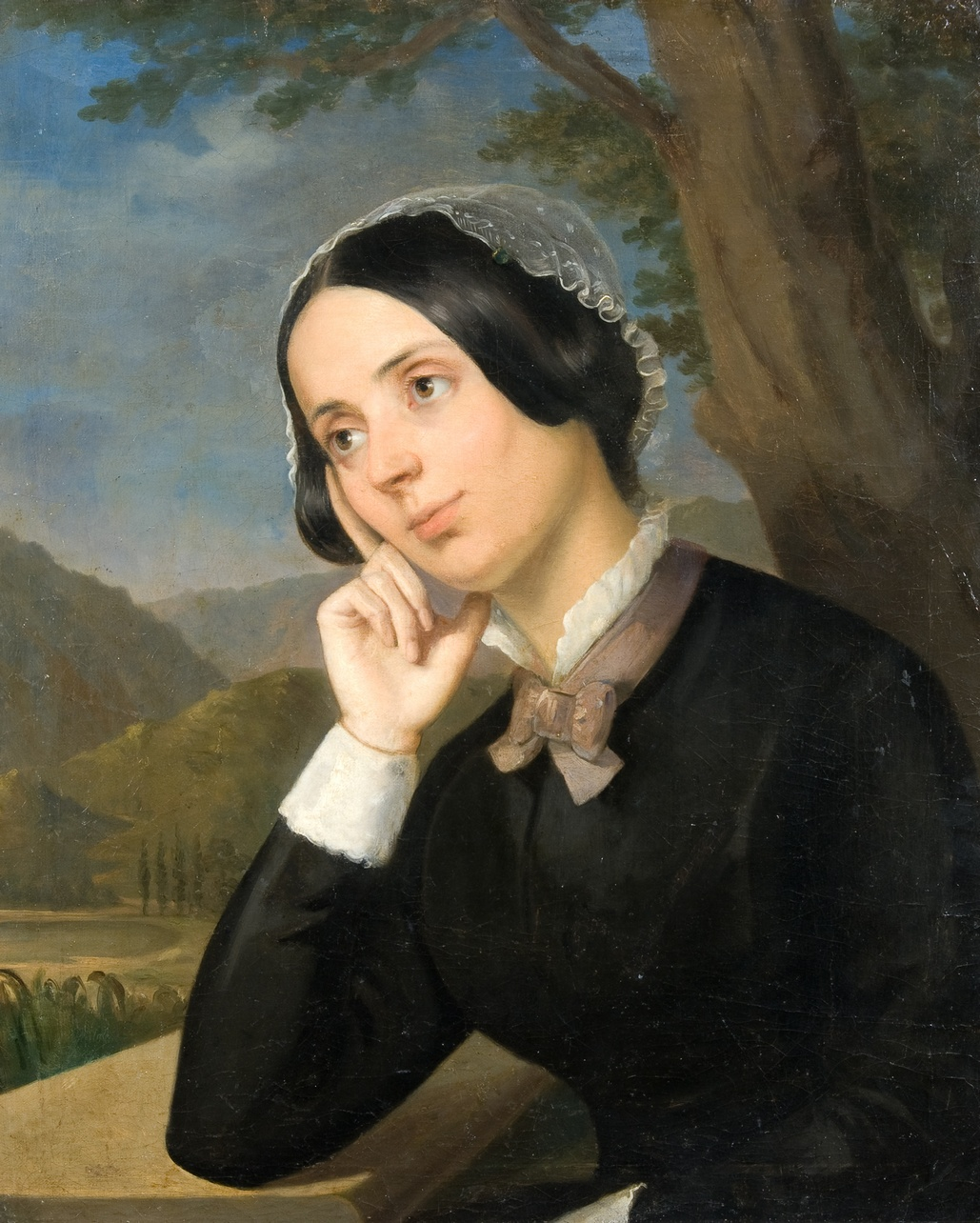
Portrait of Maria Rosetti

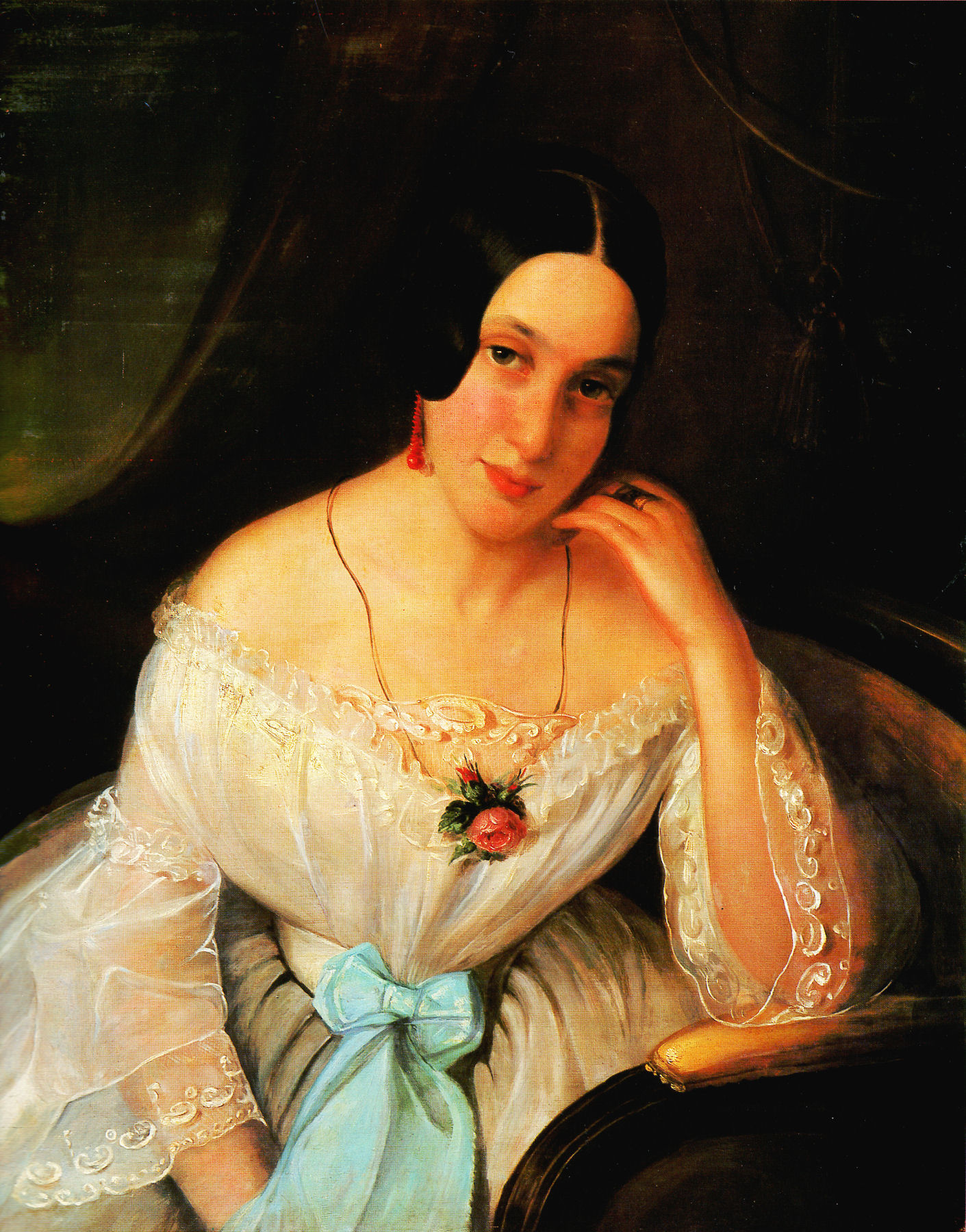
Portrait of a woman (1844)

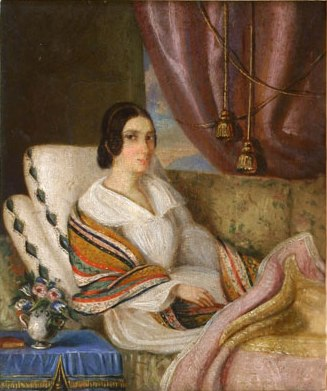
Convalescence

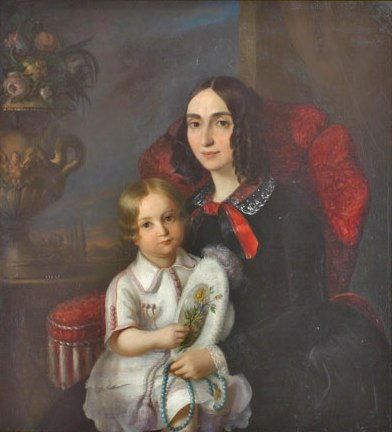
Anica Manu with her child

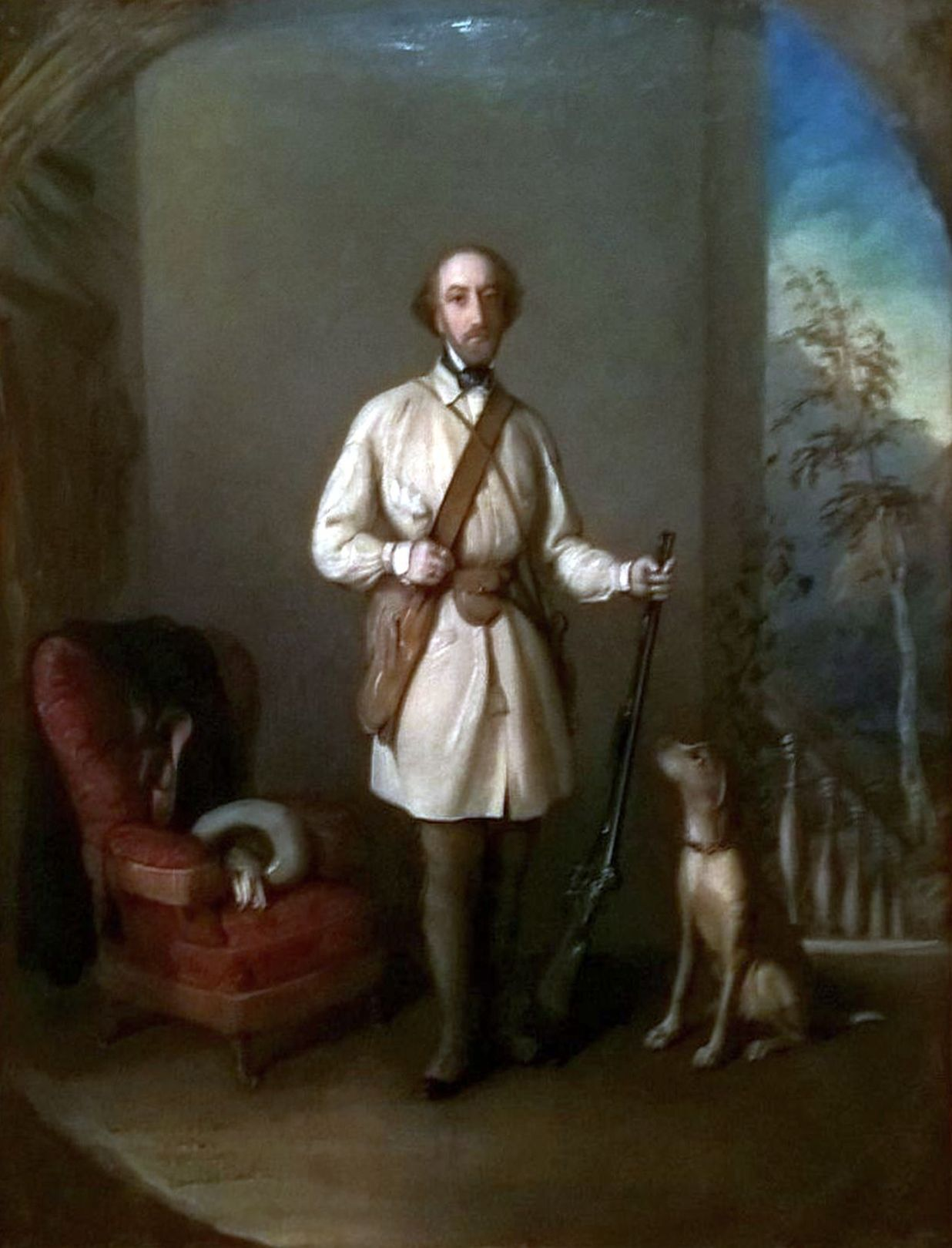
Portrait of Nicolae Golescu

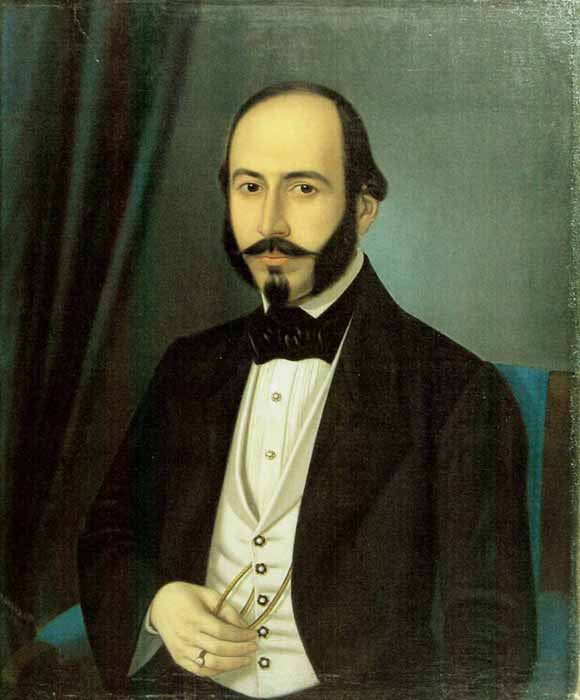
Portrait of Teodor Arion

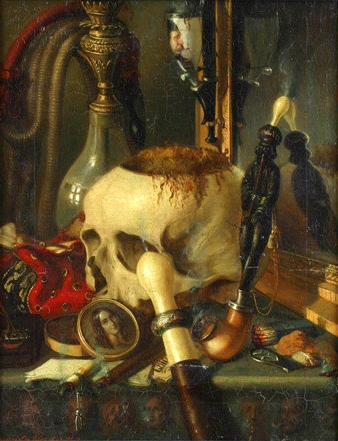
Vanity (1848)
