= Podul Grant =

Bridge in Romania

Coordinates: 44°27′19.39″N 26°3′41.54″E

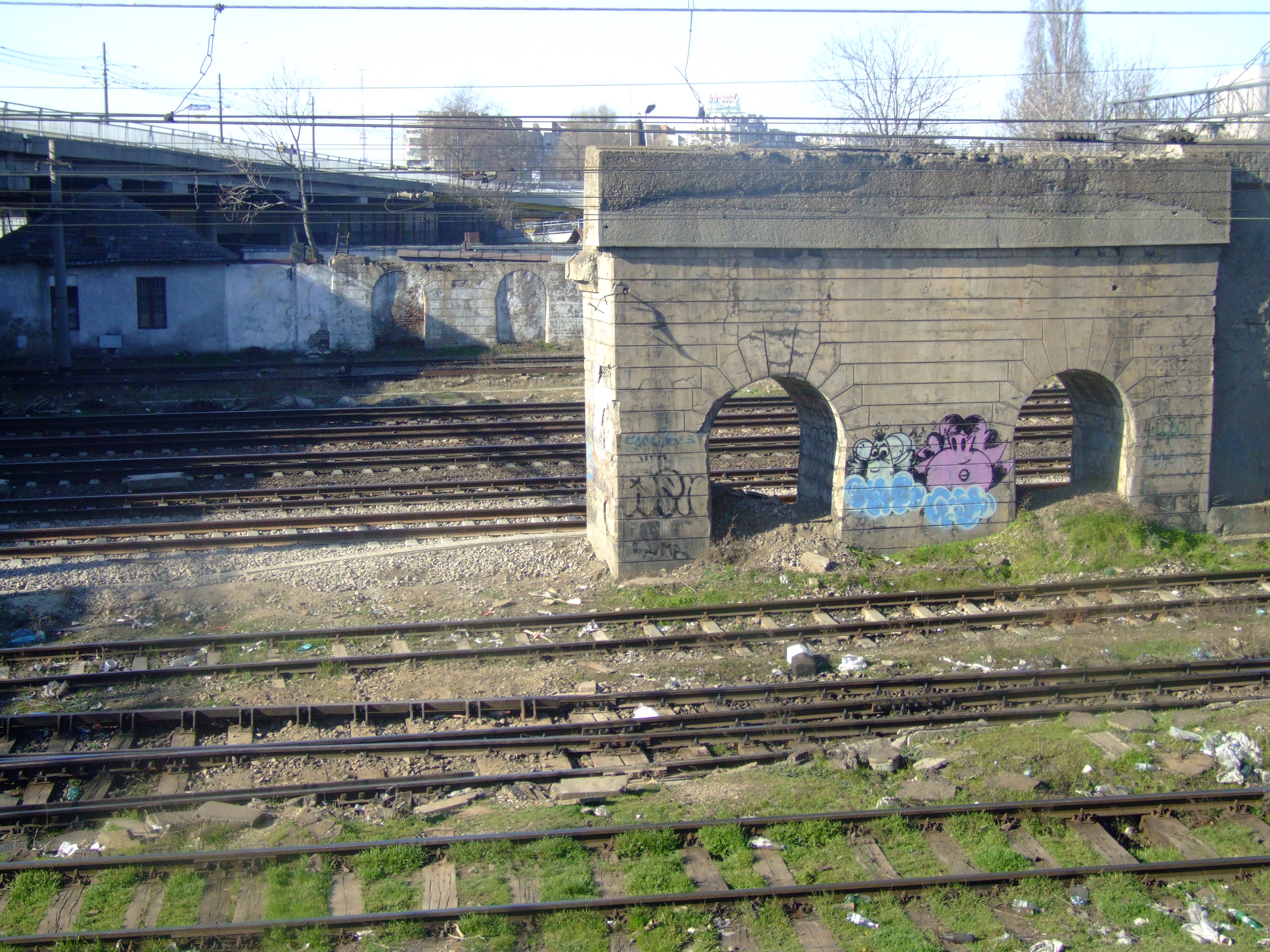
Remains of the old bridge.

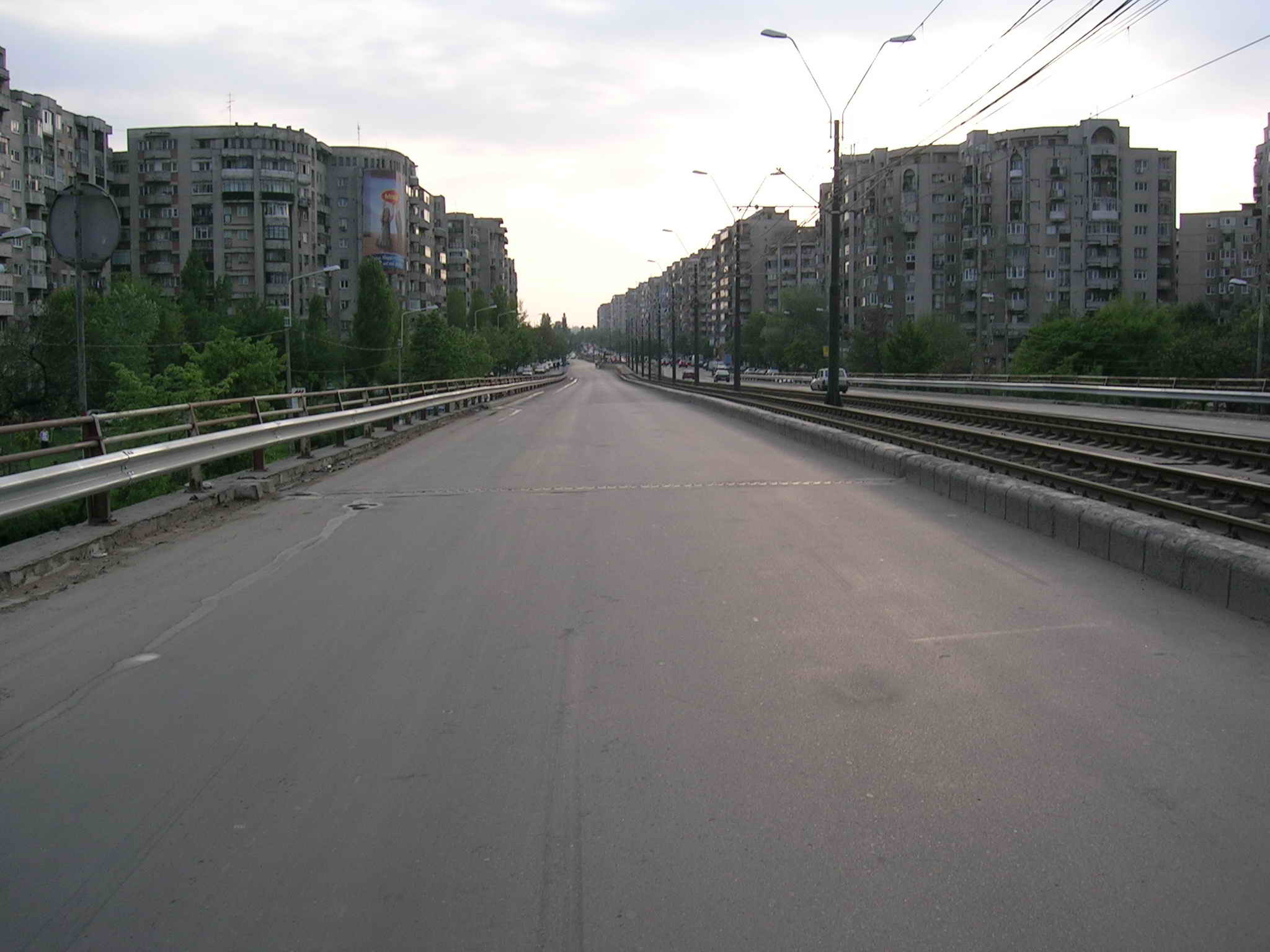
Podul Grant, as seen from Crângași toward Ion Mihalache Boulevard

Podul Grant (Grant Bridge) is a bridge that serves both motorway and lightrail transportation in Bucharest, Romania. It is named after Effingham Grant, the British consul in Bucharest during the mid-19th century. Initially, the bridge was made of steel, and opened in 1909. Between 1979 and 1982, the old bridge was mostly demolished, to make way for a brand new concrete one, with slip ramps and wider lanes. Since then, a number of maintenance and modernisation projects have been executed.

The bridge is located in the Giulești neighborhood of Sector 6 in the city. It serves as a route for tram way (line 41), which was upgraded while Traian Băsescu was mayor, becoming the first lightrail line in Bucharest.

Today, the bridge connects Crângași Square with Turda Street, crossing west–east over Giulești Boulevard, the railroads and Grivița Boulevard. It is one of the symbols of the football club Rapid București, its stadium being located right by the bridge.

The Grant Bridge figures prominently in the 1978 movie Revenge, directed by Sergiu Nicolaescu. The popular song Podul Grant by Gică Petrescu celebrated the bridge and the nostalgia associated with it.

== See also ==
- List of bridges in Romania
