= Robert Gilmour Colquhoun =

British diplomat

British Agent and Consul-General in Egypt
- In office 14 January 1859 – 1865

British Agent in Romania
- In office 18 November 1851 – 1858

British Consul-General in Romania
- In office 15 December 1837 – 1858

British Consul in Romania
- In office 18 January 1835 – 15 December 1837

Personal details
- Born: 9 January 1803 Glasgow, Scotland
- Died: 10 November 1870 (aged 67) Pitlochry, Scotland
- Education: Pembroke College, Oxford

Sir Robert Gilmour Colquhoun KCB (9 January 1803 – 10 November 1870) was a Scottish diplomat.

== Biography ==
Colquhoun was born on Jamaica Street, Glasgow, and baptised in Luss, Dunbartonshire, the eldest and only surviving son of Robert Colquhoun, 16th of Camstradden and Harriet Farrer. He was educated at Pembroke College, Oxford. He was appointed consul in Bucharest, Romania on 18 January 1835, consul-general on 15 December 1837, and agent and consul-general on 18 November 1851. He received the Order of the Nichan Iftikhar. He was employed in Bosnia in 1854.

He was appointed agent and consul-general in Egypt on 14 January 1859. He served there until he retired in 1865 with the confidence and respect of the British government, and the rank of Knight Commander of the Order of the Bath.

He died in Pitlochry, aged 67.

Diplomatic posts
Preceded by Frederick Wright-Bruce	British Agent and Consul-General in Egypt; 1859–1865	Succeeded by Edward Stanton
