= Roxani Soutzos =

Phanariote Greek Princess of Moldavia from 1819 to 1821

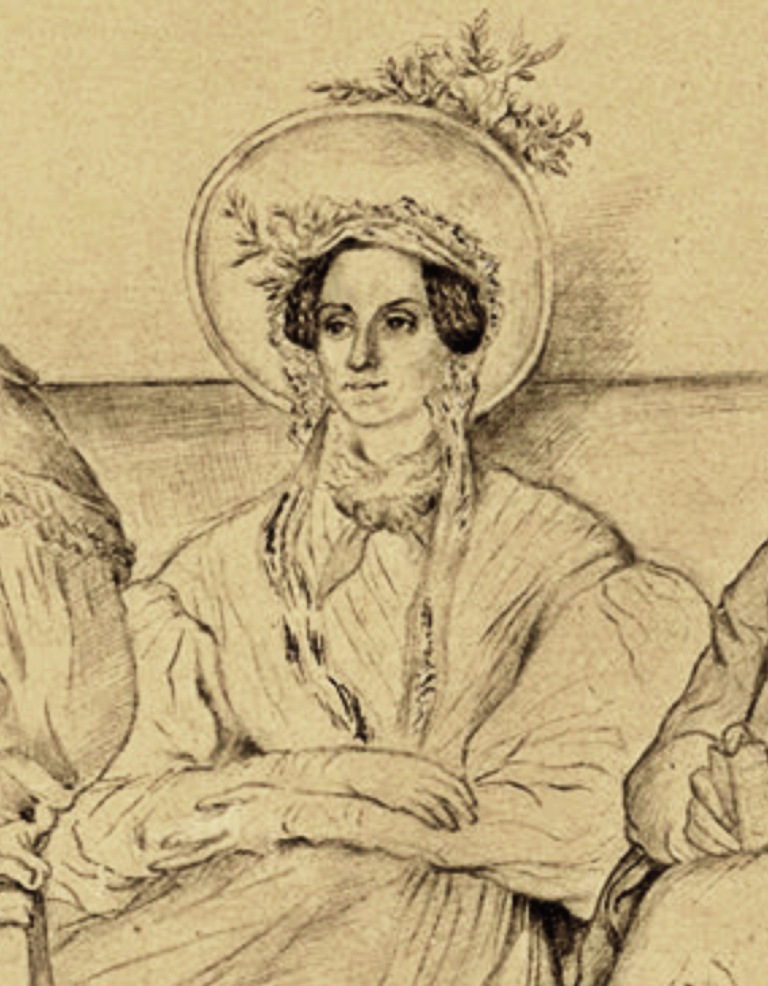
- Sketch by Louis Dupré, c. 1830

Princess-consort of Moldavia
- Reign: 24 June 1819 – 4 April 1821
- Predecessor: Smaragda Callimachi
- Successor: None (Ecaterina Sturdza from 1822)
- Born: Roxani Karatza; Ρωξάνη Καρατζά; 1783
- Died: April 1868 (aged 84–85); Athens, Kingdom of Greece
- Spouse: Michael Soutzos
- Issue: Ioannis "Michalvoda" Soutzos; Gregorios Soutzos; Georgios "Iorgu" Soutzos; Konstantinos Soutzos; Rallou Paparrigopoulos; Eleni Soutzos; Maria Zographos
Regnal name
- Roxandra Suțul; Роѯандра Сȣцȣл
- House: Karatzas (Caradja); Soutzos
- Father: John Caradja
- Mother: Eleni Skanavi
- Occupation: Cultural promoter

Roxani Karatza-Soutzos (Greek: Ρωξάνη Καρατζά Σούτσου or Σούτζου, also Ρωξάνη Βόδα Σούτσου, Roxani Voda Soutsou, Romanian: Roxandra or Roxana Caragea Suțu[l], Cyrillic: Роѯандра [Караџѣ] Сȣцȣл, French: Roxane Soutzo or Suzzo; 1783 – April 1868) was a Phanariote Greek cultural animator, initially active inside the Ottoman Empire; the daughter of John Caradja, sister of Rallou Karatza-Argyropoulos, and wife of Michael Soutzos, she served as Princess-consort of Moldavia in June 1819 – April 1821. This matrimonial arrangement united the powerful Caradjas with the more politically frail Soutzoses, but the two Phanariote clans were soon at odds with one another—Roxani favored her adoptive family. The break was initiated in late 1812, when Caradja was made Prince of Wallachia under Ottoman tutelage. Serving as the Great Dragoman, Michael also competed for that position, and worked to topple his father-in-law. The latter finally abandoned his throne in late 1818, but Michael lost the competition to his second-uncle, Alexandros; he was compensated with the Moldavian throne.

During her short reign, Roxani fully backed her husband's cooperation with the Filiki Eteria, and helped instigate the Greek War of Independence, which began on Moldavian soil in February 1821. As it became apparent that the Eterist cause would fail, Michael abdicated and decided to emigrate with his family—making Roxani the last-ever Phanariote Princess in Moldavia. The Soutzoses were evicted into the Russian Empire, settling for a while in Kishinev—where Roxani networked with two literary figures, Alexander Pushkin and Jean Alexandre Buchon. They were allowed to live there only until 1822, when the Ottomans asked for Michael to be extradited. After a three-year detention in the Austrian Empire, from 1825 they settled together with the Caradjas in the Grand Duchy of Tuscany, and involved themselves in political intrigues. They were left financially destitute after the Eterist adventure, obtaining intercessions on their behalf from Swiss banker Jean-Gabriel Eynard; for a while, Michael took his family to Geneva.

The newly proclaimed Greek Republic, which was generally anti-Phanariote in sentiment, ignored the Soutzoses throughout the 1820s, even as they pledged their allegiance to its government. Following Eynard's interventions, Michael was assigned to be a Greek diplomatic envoy in Bourbon France (which became the July Monarchy during his tenure), but ultimately marginalized as a dangerous supporter of the Russian Party. The subsequently established Greek kingdom assigned Michael to various positions, including that of Ambassador to Russia. Roxani lived with him in Paris and Saint Petersburg in the 1830s, as did their first-born son, Ioannis "Michalvoda", who was the legation secretary. The princely couple spent their final decades in Athens, where Roxani was heading a literary salon. By the time of her death in 1868, her in-laws included Greek academic Petros Paparrigopoulos and Romanian politician Dimitrie Sturdza.

== Biography ==
=== Early life and ascendancy ===
Roxani was born in 1783, which made her slightly older than her future husband. She descended not just from the Caradjas, but also from other major Phanariote clans of the Ottoman realm; her paternal grandmother Sultana was a Mavrocordatos—making Roxani the great-granddaughter of John II Mavrocordatos, who was Moldavia's Prince in the 1740s, as well as a distant descendant of pre-Phanariote Moldavian royalty (including 15th-century Prince Stephen the Great). Roxani's mother was Eleni Skanavi, daughter of a Phanariote banker. The couple had four other children. The best known among them is Princess Rallou, born in 1799 at Istanbul, who married Georgios Argyropoulos (or Arghiropol). John and Eleni's youngest daughter, Smaragda, married Spyridon Demetrios Mavrogenis; they also had two sons, Georgios and Konstantinos (the latter of whom was born "around 1799").

Roxani's father ascended to the position of Great Dragoman in 1812, and appointed Michael "Michalakis" Soutzos as his secretary. Michael and Roxani were known to have been married the same year, though genealogist Constantin Gane argues that they may have already been wed around 1800. Their first child, Ioannis "Michalvoda" Soutzos, was born on 30 August 1813. He was followed by three more sons—Gregorios, Georgios, Konstantinos—and three daughters—Rallou (married Paparrigopoulos), Eleni (Soutzos), Maria (Zographos). Of these, Georgios is known to have been born in 1817, and Konstantinos in 1820. According to an 1817 report by Prussian diplomat Alexander Freiherr von Miltitz, Michael, a "singularly handsome man", had, before his marriage, "barely had the means to support himself; since his marriage, he receives from his father-in-law a monthly stipend of seventy thousand piasters, and at times extraordinary installments of another fifty to a hundred and twenty thousand piasters each."

In late 1812, Roxani's father had obtained the throne of Wallachia, a Romanian-inhabited client-state of the Ottoman Empire, like neighboring Moldavia (the two "Danubian Principalities"). This also meant a political rise for Argyroupoulos, who seconded his father-in-law as Caimacam, and was later Great Ban over the Wallachian fief, Oltenia. As reported by Prussian diplomats in October 1815, at a time when Caradja had disappointed Sultan Mahmud II, Michael Soutzos was a favorite for the throne in Bucharest. He finally took over as Great Dragoman in October 1817, after purchasing support from Halet Efendi, the influential Ottoman courtier, who was also his alleged partner in fraudulent deals. He saw this position as a stepping stone toward the Wallachian throne, and spend money on bribes to obtain his appointment.

In Wallachia, the Caradjas were promoting Greek culture—in late 1817, Princess Rallou founded in Bucharest "the first professional (Greek-language) theatrical troupe in the Romanian lands." Such initiatives were increasingly manifestations of Greek nationalism, supported by Filiki Eteria, the anti-Ottoman secret society. 1817 was also the year when Bucharest was visited by Eterist Nikolaos Galatis—although he did not manage to recruit John Caradja for his cause, he initiated Roxani's brother Konstantinos; her Argyropoulos brother-in-law was also a member, and as scholar Elisavet Papalexopoulou suggests, there is reason to assume that Princess Rallou was also an Eterist, or at least an applicant. In late 1818, anticipating Ottoman revenge, Prince John fled Wallachia, finding safety in the Austrian Empire, and then in the Swiss Confederacy. This incident exposed Halet and his retinue to persecution by the angered sultan; as Prussian Leopold von Schladen argued at the time, Halet was not entirely neutralized, and it was still possible for Michael Soutzos to take over in Bucharest. The throne went instead to Alexandros Soutzos, who was Michael's aged second-uncle. The Sultan's decree barred almost all Phanariotes, but not the Soutzoses, from holding princely offices in either Wallachia or Moldavia.

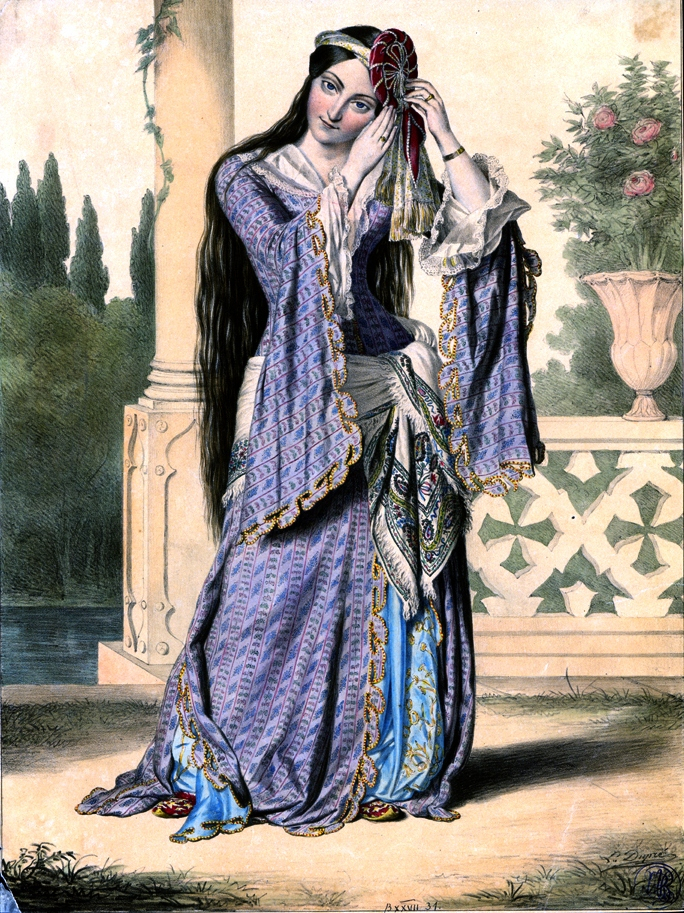
Roxani's daughter Eleni in an 1820 print by Dupré

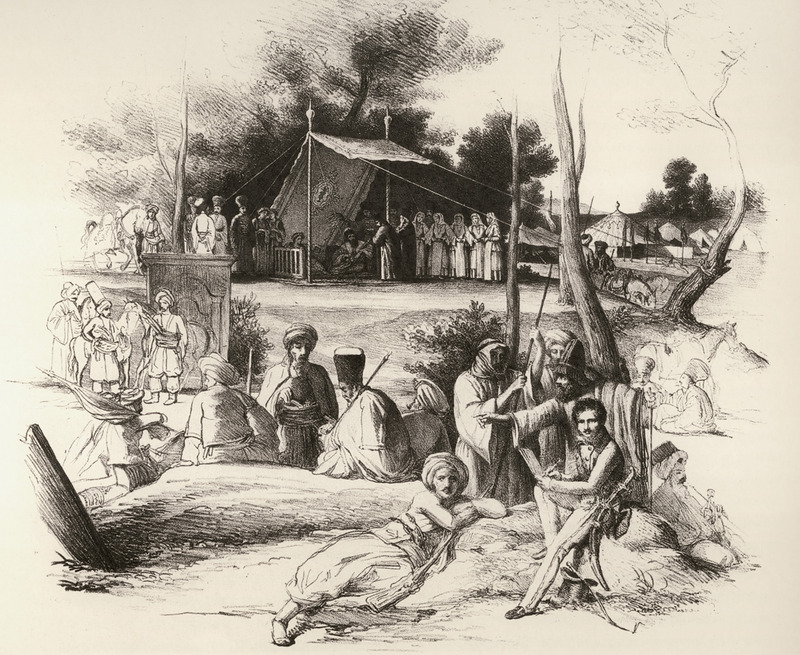
The encampment of the prince of Moldavia, also by Dupré; showing Michael, Roxani, and two of their daughters, far in the background

By 1819, Michael had started business as a restaurateur in Bucharest, being granted Dudeasca Inn by his boyaress mother, Safta Dudescu. He was finally appointed Prince of Moldavia on 24 June 1819, with the expiration of Scarlat Callimachi's seven-year term of office; Smaragda Mavrogenes-Callimachi, who was Roxani's maternal aunt, had been her predecessor as the princely consort. Upon his departure to Moldavia, the new ruler had already caused scandal with his extravagant spending and his toleration of corrupt practices. As noted by Gane, the Soutzos ascendancy remains poorly documented in traditional sources, but is somewhat rich in visual documents. This is thanks to Moldavia being visited by an artist from the Frenchman Louis Dupré, who drew portraits of Michael, Eleni, and, more unusually, a picture of the princely tent, which includes Roxani and two of her daughters. This itinerant court welcomed the last arrivals in the Phanariote clientele of Moldavia, such as the Romalo and Cozadini families, and including Sultana Cozadini, who was Roxani's chambermaid. As the junior Prince (or Beizadea), Georgios Soutzos performed as godfather at Sultana's wedding to a Moldavian boyar, Ioan Cuza.

=== Eterist revolt and exile ===
Despite Ottoman expectations, Soutzos' short reign was marked by his full support for the Eteria, which had established bases in the Bessarabia Governorate (on Russia's new border with Moldavia). The Prince and the Eterist chief Alexander Ypsilantis conspired together to start a Greek War of Independence from Moldavia, with Soutzos pledging his wealth, as well as the entire military forces of Moldavia, to the realization of this goal. In February 1821 a Russian spy, Pavel Pestel, recorded rumors that Soutzos was made aware that the Eterists and the Arnauts were preparing a revolt, but had asked his boyars to keep quiet. According to his own testimony, Michael was not informed in advance when, later that month, Ypsilantis and his Sacred Band invaded Moldavia, thus initiating war with the Ottomans. Pestel reports that the Moldavian ruler visited the Eterist commander soon after his arrival, tolerated his pillaging of his subjects' property, and took personal charge of the Eterist recruitment drive. He was also in the audience at Iași when Ypsilantis recited his proclamation to the Greeks.

The princely couple followed news of the Eterist advances, as well as of the parallel uprising in Wallachia. The Freiherr von Miltitz alleges that the revolt was helped along by Michael, who ordered his more cautious great-uncle to be poisoned, ensuring a power-vacuum in Bucharest. In a letter to her father, dated 19 March, Roxani expressed the hope that the new government in Bucharest, formed around Postelnic Constantin Negri, would be fully Eterist. She optimistically urged Prince John to leave his place of exile and join them in Bessarabia or Moldavia-proper, claiming that the Imperial Russian Army was readying itself to join the war on the Greek side, and that Moldavian Greeks had collected 3 million piasters to help the cause. As noted by historian Nestor Camariano, John Caradja had no way of passing through Austria without being arrested, and probably no intention of even attempting the journey.

Both the Ottomanist segment of the Phanariotes and the Moldavian boyardom violently rejected Ypsiliantis and Soutzos; the latter was excommunicated by the Ottoman Greek synod. Prince Michael, who had unsuccessfully asked for Moldavia to be remade into a Russian protectorate, handed in his resignation on 29 March (New Style: 4 April); he then asked the Russian consul, Andrey Pizani, to protect him and his family—this request was granted. On the night of 11 April, the Soutzoses evacuated Moldavia, settling in Russian Bessarabia. They lived in Kishinev, the gubernial capital, bunking with the Bessarabians Bogdan and Petrache Mavrogheni, in whose home they met Russian poet Alexander Pushkin. The Princess also met and befriended French scholar Jean Alexandre Buchon, who lived at Ovidiopol, and who later dedicated her his Chronique de la conquête de Constantinople. As Bouchon notes therein, he often discussed the history of Greece with his Phanariote host.

The Ypsiliantis interregnum and its aftermath saw the definitive end of Phanariote rules. In Moldavia, a senior boyar, Ioan Sturdza, took over as Prince, with Ecaterina Rosetti-Sturdza as his consort. The Greek rebels of the Peloponnese, meanwhile, sought to recognize both Caradja and his Soutzos son-in-law. On 9 January 1822, the Peloponnesian Senate opted for a Phanariote monarchy, and elected itself a 12-member regency council ("Greek Central Government"). Caradja was appointed its chairman, and Soutzos its vice-chairman, with a boat being sent in to pick them up from the Grand Duchy of Tuscany, which was Caradja's country of residence. Russian Emperor Alexander I's turn against the Eterists ensured that the Ottomans could ask for Michael to be extradited; this in turn led to his expulsion from Russia, also in January 1822. On 2 March, he was apprehended at Brünn, in Austrian Bohemia, reportedly trying to make his way to Livorno in Tuscany. Chancellor Klemens von Metternich, who "would not allow any Greek to cross over from his states into Greece", had Michael deported to Gorizia, in the Kingdom of Illyria. His family also joined him in this Austrian exile, and were by his side as he crossed through Laibach on 26 March. Initial rumors, that Michael had been granted a Russian passport allowing him safe passage to Livorno, and then by sea to the Peloponnese, were officially dismissed that April. The runaway Prince spent the following three years as a prisoner in Gorizia.

Michael was allowed to leave for Tuscany in early 1825, joining the Caradjas in Pisa. In a letter from 1826, John Caradja speaks about "my unfortunate son-in-law Michalakis [Soutzos]", a man of "complete stupidity", as aspiring to become King of Greece. As Caradja notes, this project was supported by Lord Cochrane, after Soutzos' coaxing of Cochrane's wife—to whom he gifted dresses owned by Roxani. The indignant Caradja asked his nephew, Alexandros Mavrokordatos, to continue taking care of the Soutzos children, implying that Michael was incompetent. The Countess of Blessington befriended John's son Konstantinos, as well as the Argyropoulouses and the Soutzoses, during her passage through Pisa in January–April 1827; the three families dined together, but never discussed politics. She describes Michael as having "superior abilities", and Roxani as a "very amiable woman".

=== Greek naturalization ===
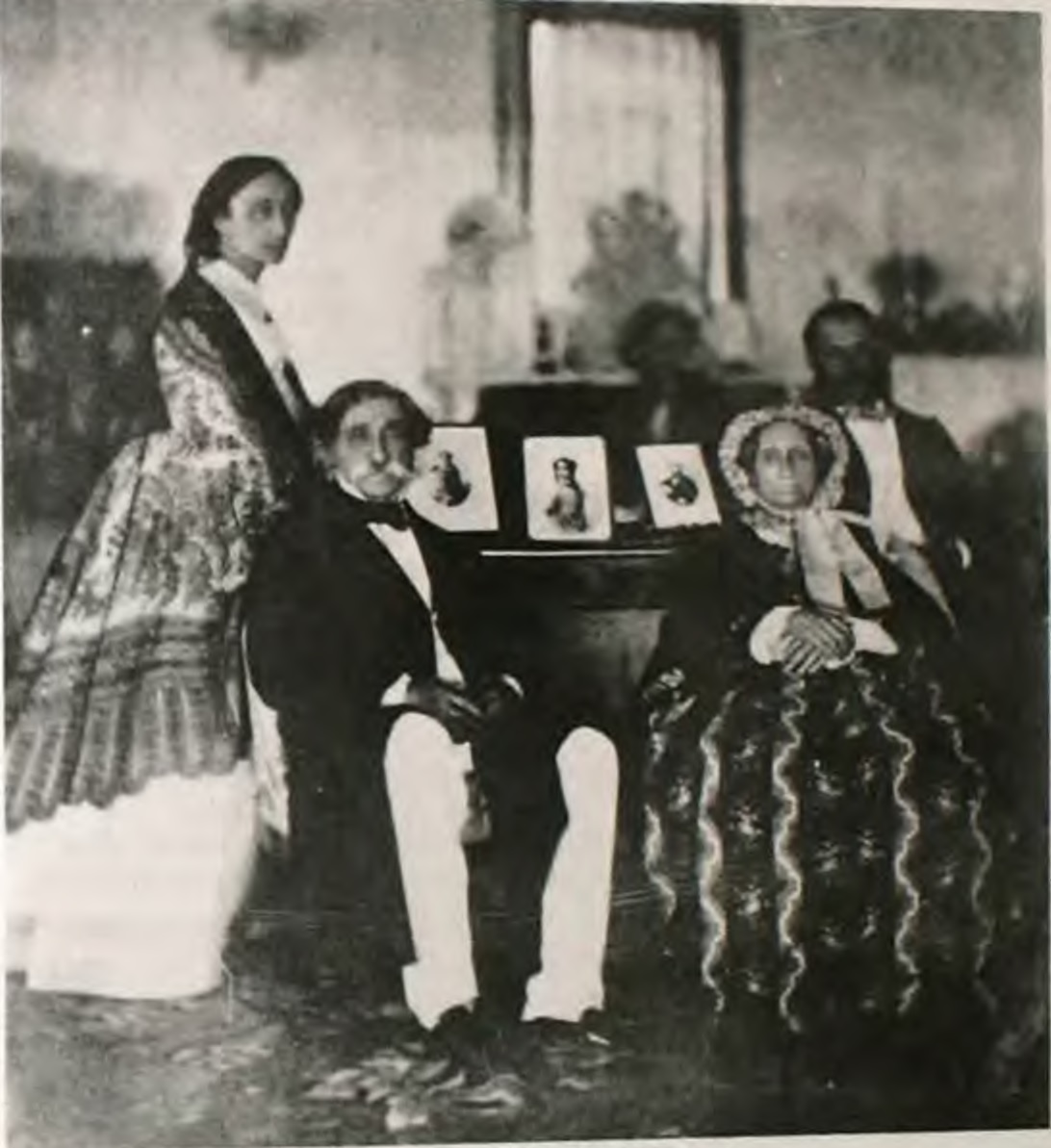
The Soutzoses in 1850s. From left: Eleni, Michael, Roxani, and Eleni's husband Ioannis (also a Soutzos)

During the mid-1820s, a Greek Republic was consolidating in the Ottoman-liberated areas. According to Buchon, Roxani was fully supportive of this polity and its egalitarian agenda, since: Mieux être servante dans la Grèce libre que princesse dans la Grèce esclave ("Better to be a servant in Greece liberated than a princess in Greece enslaved"). The Greek executive leader, Ioannis Kapodistrias, explained in 1829 that the former Prince was regarded with suspicion in the new country: "they don't even view him as a Greek. Perhaps later they will accept him." In June 1828, Michael, described in Le Figaro as "Moldavia's last Greek hospodar", was in Geneva, where he enlisted three of his sons at Rodolphe Töpffer's Lyceum. He obtained several letters of recommendation: one from Alphonse de Lamartine, the celebrated French poet, and his wife Elisa, another from Ignatios Babalos, the exiled former Metropolitan of Ungro-Wallachia, and several from the Swiss banker Jean-Gabriel Eynard. Eynard also proposed that Soutzos take over as the Greek ambassador to Bourbon France. In his thank-you letters, Michael describes his own destitute condition, which meant living in the Plainpalais, a working-class area, alongside his two parents, his daughters, and his youngest boy, Konstantinos. In July–August, Roxani vacationed alone in Turin, the Sardinian capital, where she was known as: "Princess Soutzo Rosandre, Russian, arriving in from Florence".

In November 1829, Michael arrived in France, still in his private capacity (though backed by Eynard). He was received by the King of France, Charles X, as well as by the Dauphin Louis. The other Soutzoses continued to live on Swiss territory to April 1830, when Charles offered to provide for the education of Michael's first two sons. Michael moved permanently to Paris around 18 April, with the press calling him a diplomatic envoy of the new Greek state; this status was only acknowledged by Kapodistria in late June. His last activity in Switzerland was his attempt to contact Leopold of Saxe-Cobourg, who was visiting Geneva, and whom Greeks politicians intended to appoint as their king. Roxani and her children joined him on his new mission in May, when they registered in Paris at the Hôtel de Bruxelles; two months after their arrival, France went through a liberal revolution which toppled Charles X and created the July Monarchy. At some point during the following decade, the entire family posed for a portrait by Dupré, this time in their Western costume. One of Kapodistrias' letters to Eynard shows that, in November 1830, Soutzos and his "large family" were still struggling financially: "You plead that we grant him 36,000 francs each year, by act of government. [Yet] there is not one French-speaking Greek who wouldn't fancy himself capable of being our diplomatic agent in Paris. There is not one Greek who doesn't detest those Phanariote Greeks, and from the very bottom of his heart."

Michael ultimately received his pension from May 1831, as recognition for his services in obtaining a loan from the United Kingdom (and just months before Kapodistrias' assassination). From October 1833, he served the newly recognized Kingdom of Greece as its envoy to Russia. His appointment doubled as a demotion—it came shortly after the attempted coup by Theodoros Kolokotronis, which had revealed the spread and power held by Greece's Russian Party; as an adherent of the latter, Soutzos could not be sacked, but he also could not continue to serve in Paris. He was known to be residing in Saint Petersburg with his wife, in November 1833, and again in 1837; Ioannis "Michalvoda", their son, was legation secretary in 1835–1837. A branch of the family, headed by Roxani's mother-in-law Safta Dudescu, had remained in Bucharest; in February 1836, Michael called on her to sell Dudeasca Inn. It was finally acquired in 1839 by Roxani's brother-in-law, Konstantinos.

Michael returned to take up a position in the Greek Council of State, but, after renewed scandal over his Russian commitments, resigned all his public offices in 1839. Of Roxani's sons, Konstantinos (also known as "Suțu-Dudescu") was an officer in both the Hellenic and French Navies, seeing action with the latter during the Pastry War of Mexico. The Soutzoses lived in Athens, as did the Argyropulouses; both Roxani and her sister Rallou set up "philological salons" to provide for the education of Greek women. Ioannis "Michalvoda" continued to serve as a diplomat in Russia, where he married Yekaterina Dmitrievna Obreskova, daughter of a Privy Councillor, and herself noted for sponsoring composer Frédéric Chopin. Obreskova was a presence at the court of Otto and Amalia, alongside Roxani's daughters Maria Zographos and Eleni Soutzos; through her daughter Rallou, Roxani was the mother-in-law of jurist Petros Paparrigopoulos.

Prince John also retired to Greece, finally settling in Athens. A longtime sufferer from asthma, he died there on 27 December 1844. His son-in-law returned to anti-Ottoman activities, and, in 1854, took charge of an insurrectionist committee organizing the Epirote Revolt—prompting Western intervention on the Ottomans' side. Michael died in Athens on 12 June 1864, leaving Roxani a widower to her death, which occurred in that same city in April 1868, 47 years after the end of her stint as Princess-consort. A death notice in the Allgemeine Zeitung added: "[She] sacrificed throne and property in 1821 in favor of the Greek uprising and since then had resided in Athens. She was a benefactor to the poor of Athens and was buried with princely honors."

The Phanariotes had by then divided themselves into various branches, generally split between Greece and the United Principalities of Moldavia and Wallachia, whose first ruler, or Domnitor, was Alexandru Ioan Cuza, son of Roxani's chambermaid. Among the naturalized Romanian category, Constantin N. Suțu, who was Alexandros Soutzos' great-grandson and Michael's distant nephew, led the Phanariote-and-Ottoman resistance to Cuza's Romanian nationalism in the 1860s. Roxani's sailor son, Konstantinos, died in 1869, and was buried at Izvorul Tămăduirii Church, Bucharest. The Princess was also survived by her sister, Rallou Argyroupoulos, who died in 1870 at Thonberg, in the Kingdom of Saxony. Georgios Soutzos, known to Romanians as "Iorgu Suțu", remained active in the United Principalities to his death in 1875. He was a prominent figure in the Romanian Freemasonry, a racehorse breeder, and, from 1861, brother-in-law of Dimitrie Sturdza (himself a major political figure in the Principalities, and, from 1881, the Kingdom of Romania). The Soutzos–Obreskova union produced two sons and two daughters; Iorgu, meanwhile, left a son, George G. Suțu, who served in the Romanian Land Forces.
