= Martin Hartmann =

German orientalist (1851–1918)

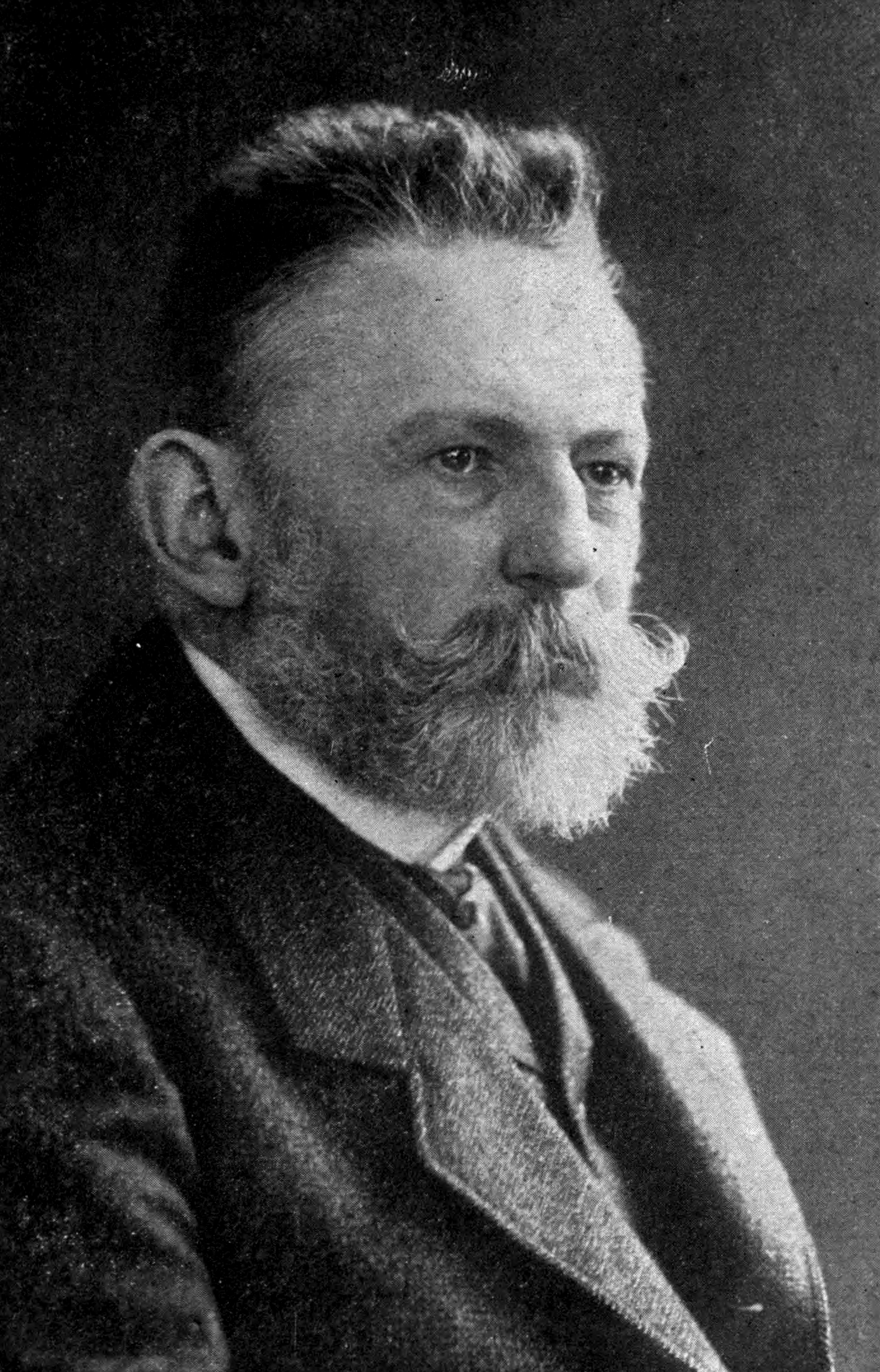
Martin Hartmann

Martin Hartmann (9 December 1851, Breslau – 5 December 1918, Berlin) was a German orientalist, who specialized in Islamic studies.

In 1875, he received his doctorate at the University of Leipzig as a student of Heinrich Leberecht Fleischer. From 1876 to 1887 he served as a dragoman at the German General Consulate in Beirut. From 1887 until his death in 1918 he taught classes at the Department of Oriental Languages in Berlin.

As a professor in Berlin he strove hard for the recognition of Islamic studies as an independent discipline. His numerous contributions to the field of Islamic studies were based on a sociological standpoint. Many of these works were published in the journal "Die Welt des Islams" (The World of Islam), a publication of the "Deutsche Gesellschaft für Islamkunde", an organization that Hartmann was a co-founder of in 1912.

== Reception of views ==
In his translation and commentary of Lothrop Stoddard's The New World of Islam (1922), the Druze aristocrat and author Shakib Arslan took issue with Hartmann's criticism of Abdulhamid II's dealings with China and ridiculed the view that Hartmann had expressed about a supposed Hadith which recommended not fighting the Turks, and which Hartmann considered to be an obvious forgery aiming to religiously discourage rebellion against the Turks. Hartmann, who mastered both the Turkish and Arabic languages, had expressed a strong dislike for the Turks whom he considered to be a "dumb race" and had recommended that Arabs should ally with intellectually-similar races, namely the Greeks, Armenians, and some Albanians, in order to overthrow the rule of the Turks. Several orientalists had identified the primacy of Turks over Arabs, which gradually began first in Baghdad in the late 9th century with the reign of the half-Turkic caliph al-Mutawakkil and culminated with the Seljuk invasions which placed various Turkic Atabegs ruling virtually everywhere in the Islamic world, as the beginning of the intellectual and civilizational decline of Islam. A view which was espoused by Hartmann as well who saw the rule of the Turks over Arabs as coinciding precisely with the beginning of the intellectual decline of Arabs. During WWI however, Hartmann completely muted his previous criticism of the Turks and started supporting the direction that the Young Turk party took during the war and the unification of the cause of Islam against imperial threats. His anti-Turkish views however impeded his career advancement as appointing him in preeminent university positions became embarrassing for the rather Turcophile Prussian authorities of the time.

== Selected works ==
- Hartmann, M. (1883). "Die Ortschaftenliste des Liwa Jerusalem in dem türkischen Staatskalender für Syrien auf das Jahr 1288 der Flucht (1871)". Zeitschrift des Deutschen Palästina-Vereins. 6: 102–149.
- Metrum und Rhythmus: Die Entstehung der arabischen Vermasse, 1896.
- Lieder der libyschen Wüste, 1899.
- "The Arabic press of Egypt", published in English in 1899.
- Der islamische Orient; Berichte und Forschungen (3 volumes, 1905–10).
- Chinesisch-Turkestan: Geschichte, Verwaltung, Geistesleben, und Wirtschaft, 1907.
- Der Islam: Geschichte -- Glaube -- Recht. Ein Handbuch, 1909.
- Islam, Mission, Politik, 1911.
- Zur Geschichte des Islam in China, 1921.
