= Iakovos Argyropoulos =

Iakovos Argyropoulos (Greek: Ιάκωβος Αργυρόπουλος; 1776–1850), known in Turkish as Yakovaki Efendi, was a Phanariote official and scholar in the service of the Ottoman Empire.

== Life ==
Iakovos Argyropoulos was a member of the Argyropoulos family, which belonged to the small circle of Phanariote families that by virtue of their knowledge of foreign languages occupied key positions in the Ottoman government during the 18th century, holding the posts of Grand Dragoman and Dragoman of the Fleet. Iakovos began his career as a secretary to the Patriarch of Constantinople, before being sent to his first diplomatic mission to the Prussian court in Berlin. He then occupied the office of Dragoman of the Fleet in 1809, as well as kapı kehaya (representative to the Ottoman government) of the island of Andros, before becoming Grand Dragoman in 1812. He served in this post until 1815, when he was ousted following the intrigues of Michael Soutzos.

After the outbreak of the Greek War of Independence in 1821, several high-ranking Phanariotes were exiled or fled the Empire abroad. Argyropoulos was exiled to Anatolia, first to Çorum, thence to Ankara in 1825, and Bursa in 1829. In 1829 he was pardoned and recalled to serve as ambassador to the Russian court alongside Stefan Bogoridi (who also had been exiled) for negotiations before the Treaty of Adrianople. Instead, Argyropoulos escaped to independent Greece, settling first in Aegina and then in Athens, where he died in 1850. His son Manuel later served as dragoman of the Greek and Russian embassies in Constantinople.

== Works ==
Argyropoulos was knowledgeable in several languages and active as a translator. His translations of Virgil and The Spirit of Law into modern Greek do not survive, as do his memoirs. He knew French well enough to write his diplomatic reports in that language—the first Ottoman official to do so—and translated Mahmud Raif Efendi's modern geographic work, Idjala al-jugrafiyya, from French into Ottoman Turkish. He also wrote a biographical history of the Russian empress Catherine the Great (Katerine Tarihi), based on the French-language history of Jean-Henri Castéra, but heavily edited, extended with events until 1801, and with detailed explanations of Russia's geography and government. Argyropoulos' work was likely written around 1813, but was first published in Egypt in 1829 and 1831. It was later heavily used, although unattributed, by Ahmed Cevdet Pasha in his own history, the Tarih-i Cevdet. During his exile, and as part of renewed Ottoman attempts to create a modern army after the suppression of the Janissaries in 1826, Argyropoulos translated European military treatises into Turkish.

== Sources ==
- Philliou, Christine M. (2011). Biography of an Empire: Governing Ottomans in an Age of Revolution. Berkeley, Los Angeles and London: University of California Press. ISBN 978-0-520-26633-9.
- Strauss, Johann (1995). "The Millets and the Ottoman Language: The Contribution of Ottoman Greeks to Ottoman Letters (19th–20th Centuries)". Die Welt des Islams. 35 (2): 189–249. doi:10.1163/1570060952597860.
