= Alexander Mavrokordatos the Exaporite =

Ottoman Greek physician and diplomat

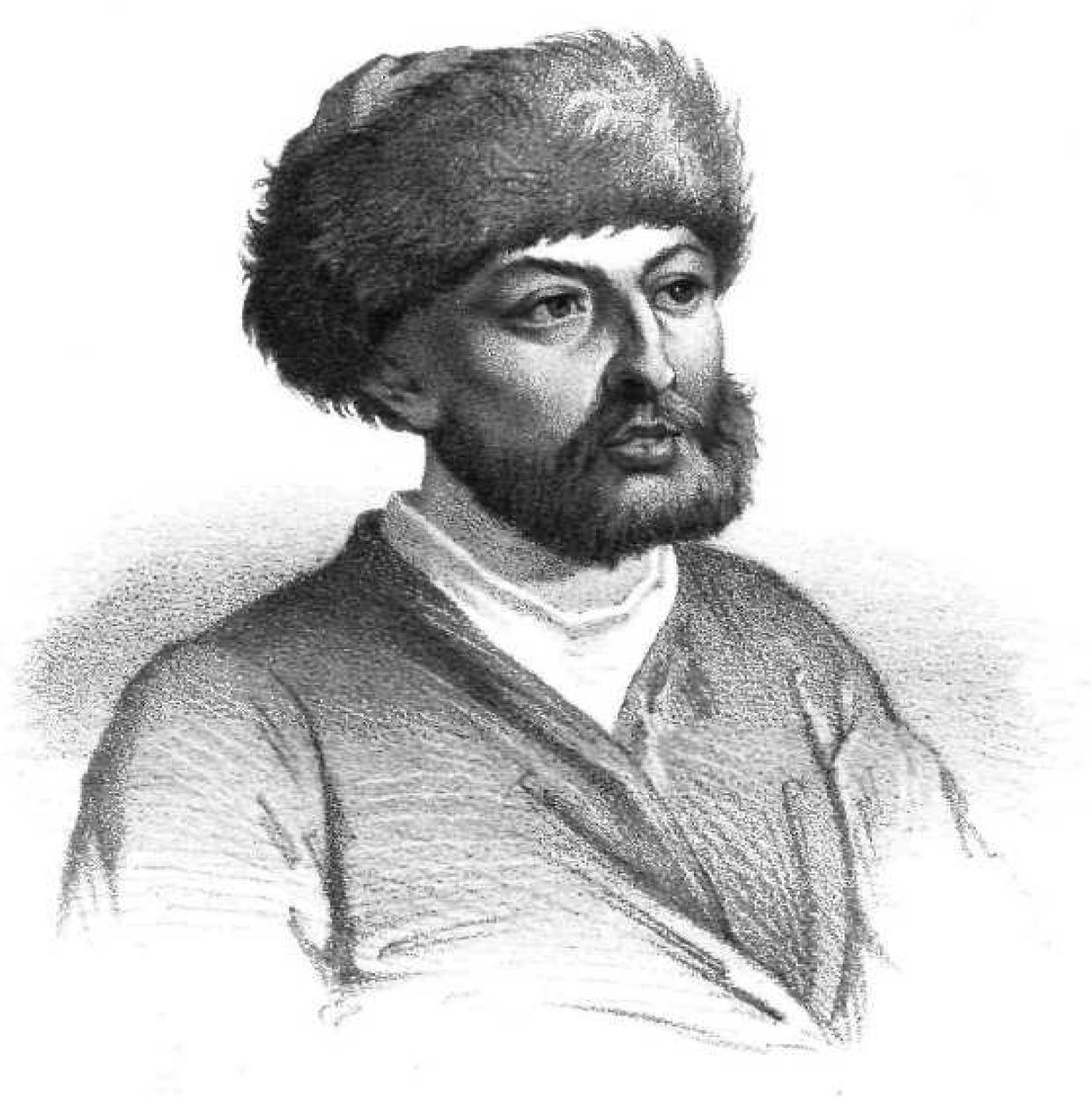
Illustration from 1854

Alexander Mavrocordatos (Greek: Ἀλέξανδρος Μαυροκορδάτος; 1636/7 or 7 November 1641 – 23 December 1709), surnamed the Exaporite (ὁ ἐξ Ἀπορρήτων, lit. '[Keeper] of the Secrets'), was a member of the Greek Mavrocordatos family, a doctor of philosophy and medicine, and Dragoman of the Porte to Sultan Mehmed IV in 1673 — notably employed in negotiations with the Habsburg monarchy during the Great Turkish War.

== Life ==
=== Origin and early life ===
Many details about Alexander Mavrokordatos' origin and early life are disputed. According to a note purported to be from his father's hand, Alexander Mavrokordatos was born on 7 November 1641. While this date is accepted by many modern scholars, others date his birth earlier, to 1636 or 1637; while the 19th-century scholar Konstantinos Oikonomos placed it as early as 1627. Likewise, while some sources record that he was born in Chios, where his family hailed from, most authorities put it in Constantinople, capital of the Ottoman Empire; and this seems to be confirmed by Alexander's own usage of the sobriquet Constantinopolitanus during his studies in Italy.

Alexander's father was the silk merchant Nikolaos Mavrokordatos—some early sources erroneously give his name as Pantelis or Pantoleon—the impoverished scion of a Chian aristocratic family who had come to Constantinople to seek his fortune, and the wealthy heiress Loxandra Scarlatou. Loxandra's father was a merchant who had grown wealthy from contracts to supply the Ottoman army, and had considerable influence at the Ottoman court. She had been married previously to Alexandru Coconul, Prince of Wallachia, after whose death in 1632 she inherited a large fortune; according to some accounts, however, the Wallachian sent her back to Constantinople when Loxandra was disfigured by smallpox just days before the wedding. There she fell in love with Nikolaos and married him. The marriage produced eight children, five boys (Ioannis, Skarlatos, Georgios, Konstantinos, Alexander) and three girls (Kokona, Mariora, Zoitza), of which Alexander was the sixth.

=== Studies and work as a teacher ===
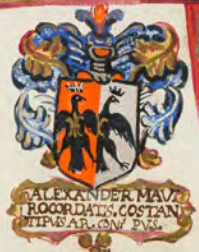
Coat of arms of "Alexander Maurocordatus Constantinopolitanus" from the arms roll of students of the University of Padua

Alexander early on showed a keen intellect, encouraged by his well-educated mother, who after the death of her husband c. 1653/55 took exclusive charge of her children's upbringing. The scholar Ioannis Karyofyllis was his teacher.

In 1656, Mavrokordatos was sent for studies to Italy, first on grammar and humanities at the Pontifical Greek College of Saint Athanasius in Rome, which he attended from 30 May 1657 to 8 June 1660, when he had to depart due to ill health. During his last two years there, he even taught himself Ancient Greek grammar to his fellow students. From Rome he moved to the University of Padua for studies in philosophy and medicine, where he distinguished himself by his eloquence and erudition, but where he was also expelled from due to his difficult character. He completed his studies at the University of Bologna, receiving his doctoral diploma on 16 May 1664. His doctoral thesis about the circulation of blood (De instrumento respirationis et circulatione sanguinis), which he published at Florence in 1664, was well received, and was later republished five times.

On his return to Constantinople, he taught medicine and philosophy at the Patriarchal Academy, whose director he became, and received the office of megas rhetor of the Patriarchate. At the same time, he complemented his income by working as a physician, while learning the languages necessary for a career in the Ottoman government: apart from Greek, Latin, and Italian, he learned Turkish, Persian, Arabic, French, and Slavonic. At about the same time, he also married his wife, Soultana, daughter of Ioannis Chrysoskolaios.

=== Career as Dragoman of the Porte ===
Mavrokordatos' ability as a physician soon brought him to the attention of the Grand Vizier, Köprülüzade Fazıl Ahmed Pasha, who made him his personal physician. Like his predecessor and mentor, Panagiotis Nikousios, this post served as a stepping-stone to higher office; after entering government service as a dragoman in 1671, he succeeded Nikousios as Grand Dragoman in 1673. He also succeeded Nikousios in the usufruct of the tax income of the island of Mykonos.

After the Ottoman defeat at the Siege of Vienna in 1683, Mavrokordatos was imprisoned as having contributed to the defeat. He escaped execution through the intervention of Köprülüzade Fazıl Ahmed's brother, Mustafa Pasha, but was obliged to pay an enormous ransom. When he could not gather the requisite sum, his property was confiscated, and his wife and mother were imprisoned; Loxandra was to die in prison after six months. Finally, after spending 12 months in prison, Alexander managed to pay off the ransom and was released. Almost immediately he was recalled to advise the Grand Vizier Sarı Süleyman Pasha on official affairs; his interim successor, a Venetian renegade, was dismissed as incompetent. Mavrokordatos' most notable achievement was as Ottoman representative at the Treaty of Karlowitz that ended the Great Turkish War, for which he received the title of mahrem-i esrar ('keeper of secrets') of the Sultan, and was named Imperial Count (which was kept secret from the Ottomans) and given rich gifts by the Holy Roman Emperor.

His authority, with that of Amcazade Köprülü Hüseyin Pasha and Rami Mehmed Pasha, was supreme at the court of Mustafa II, and he did much to ameliorate the conditions of the Christians in the Ottoman Empire. During the Edirne Incident riots in 1703 he was accused of having betrayed Ottoman interests during the negotiations at Karlowitz, and rioters in the capital demanded his death. Mavrokordatos managed to escape into hiding at Sozopol, but his property was confiscated, but he was able to return to Constantinople and his office after the accession of Ahmed III.

=== Death and succession ===
Mavrocordatos' eldest son, Nicholas Mavrocordatos, began deputizing him as Dragoman (variously given as from 1697, or 1698) as Alexander suffered from increasingly debilitating gout. Alexander Mavrocordatos died in 1709, and was succeeded by Nicholas, who did not remain long in office as he was appointed hospodar of Moldavia in the same year. Nicholas later held the office of hospodar of Moldavia again (1711–1715), followed by two terms as hospodar of Wallachia (1715–1716, 1719–1730). He was in turn succeeded as Dragoman by Alexander's younger son John, who remained in office until 1717, when he was appointed hospodar of Wallachia (until 1719).

== Works ==
Apart from his thesis, Mavrokordatos also wrote a history of the Jews, published in Bucharest in 1716; a grammar, published in Venice in 1745; a three-volume Roman history, possibly translated from Livy; a political essay, the Phrontismata, published in Vienna in 1805; a book on rhetoric; and various unpublished treatises on philosophy. He also translated into Turkish not only his thesis, but also geographical works: Gerardus Mercator's Atlas and Willem Blaeu's Theatre du Monde. In 1677, the French orientalist Antoine Galland recorded hearing a reading of a treatise by Mavrokordatos, in Italian, on the strengths and weaknesses of the Ottoman Empire. In 1689, Mavrokordatos became a member of the German Academy of Sciences Leopoldina.

=== Critical editions ===
- Tzelepis, Dimitris I. (2023). Ῥωμαϊκὰ τοῦ Ἀλέξανδρου Μαυροκορδάτου τοῦ "ἐξ Ἀπορρήτων" (in Greek). Athens: Irodotos. (4 vols.)
- Tzelepis, Dimitris I. (2024). ΠΕΡΙ ΣΥΝΤΑΞΕΩΣ ΤΩΝ ΤΟΥ ΛΟΓΟΥ ΜΕΡΩΝ τοῦ Ἀλέξανδρου Μαυροκορδάτου τοῦ «ἐξ Ἀπορρήτων» (1641-1709) (in Greek). Komotini: Modern Greek and Comparative Philology Laboratory, Democritus University of Thrace. ISBN 978-618-85138-6-0.

=== Correspondence ===
- Cernovodeanu, Paul; Caratașu, Mihail (1982). "Correspondance diplomatique d'Alexandre Mavrocordato l'Exaporite, 1676—1703 (I)" (PDF). Revue des études Sud-est européennes. 20 (1): 93–128.
- Cernovodeanu, Paul; Caratașu, Mihail (1982). "Correspondance diplomatique d'Alexandre Mavrocordato l'Exaporite, 1676—1703 II" (PDF). Revue des études Sud-est européennes. 20 (3): 327–348.
- Cernovodeanu, Paul; Caratașu, Mihail (1984). "Correspondance diplomatique d'Alexandre Mavrocordato l'Exaporite (1676—1703), III" (PDF). Revue des études Sud-est européennes. 22 (4): 327–358.
- Livadas, Theagenis (1879). Ἀλεξάνδρου Μαυροκορδάτου τοῡ ἐξ Ἀπορρήτων ἐπιστολαὶ ρ′. Trieste: Österreichischer Lloyd.

== Family ==
From his marriage with Soultana, Mavrokordatos had five children:

- Skarlatos, who died at an early age shortly after his marriage
- Nicholas
- John
- Loxandra, married Matthew Ghika
- Helen

== Sources ==
- Kamperidis, Lambros (2019) [2000]. "Mavrokordatos family". In Speake, Graham (ed.). Encyclopedia of Greece and the Hellenic Tradition, Volume 2: L–Z. Oxon and New York: Routledge. pp. 1014–1015. ISBN 978-1-57958-141-1.
- Makrides, Vasilios (2019) [2000]. "Phanariots". In Speake, Graham (ed.). Encyclopedia of Greece and the Hellenic Tradition, Volume 2: L–Z. Oxon and New York: Routledge. pp. 1294–1297. ISBN 978-1-57958-141-1.
- Philliou, Christine M. (2011). Biography of an Empire: Governing Ottomans in an Age of Revolution. Berkeley, Los Angeles and London: University of California Press. ISBN 978-0-520-26633-9.
- Stamatiadis, Epameinondas (1865). Βιογραφίαι τῶν Ἑλλήνων Μεγάλων Διερμηνέων τοῡ Ὀθωμανικοῡ Κράτους [Biographies of the Greek Great Dragomans of the Ottoman State] (in Greek). Athens: K. Tefarikis.
- Tzelepis, Dimitrios (2020). Τα Ρωμαϊκά του Αλέξανδρου Μαυροκορδάτου: κριτική έκδοση [Roman History of Alexander Mavrocordatos: critical edition] (PhD thesis) (in Greek). Democritus University of Thrace.
- Vakalopoulos, Apostolos E. (1973). Ιστορία του νέου ελληνισμού, Τόμος Δ′: Τουρκοκρατία 1669–1812 – Η οικονομική άνοδος και ο φωτισμός του γένους (Έκδοση Β′) [History of modern Hellenism, Volume IV: Turkish rule 1669–1812 – Economic upturn and enlightenment of the nation (2nd Edition)] (in Greek). Thessaloniki: Emm. Sfakianakis & Sons.

Preceded by Panagiotis Nikousios	Grand Dragoman of the Porte; 1673–1683	Succeeded by Sefer Agha
Preceded by Sefer Agha	Grand Dragoman of the Porte; 1684–1709; With: Nicholas Mavrocordatos (from 1698)	Succeeded by Nicholas Mavrocordatos
