= Dragoman of the Fleet =

Senior office in the Ottoman Empire

The Dragoman of the Fleet (Ottoman Turkish: ترسانه ترجمانی, romanized: tersâne tercümânı, lit. 'Dragoman of the Arsenal'; Greek: δραγουμάνος του στόλου) was a senior office in the Ottoman Empire, held by Phanariote Greeks during the 18th and early 19th centuries. As the chief deputy of the Kapudan Pasha, the Dragoman of the Fleet played a leading role in the administration of the various autonomous communities of the islands and coasts of the Aegean Sea that fell within the Eyalet of the Archipelago.

== History ==
The office was established in 1701, in emulation of the Grand Dragoman of the Sublime Porte, which was also reserved for Phanariotes. Indeed, the post of Dragoman of the Fleet often served as a stepping-stone to that of Grand Dragoman. The dragoman (the term means 'interpreter') had to be proficient in the "three languages" (Ottoman Turkish: السنه ثلاثه, romanized: elsine-yi s̱elâs̱e) of Arabic, Persian, and Turkish that were commonly used in the empire, as well as a number of foreign languages (usually French and Italian), but his role went far beyond a mere interpreter. He was the official intermediary between the Kapudan Pasha, the commander-in-chief of the Ottoman navy who was also governor of the Eyalet of the Archipelago, and the mostly Greek and Christian islanders and inhabitants of the shores of the Aegean Sea during the annual expeditions of the Ottoman fleet for the collection of the taxes, as well as the resolution of administrative problems. The post also entailed responsibilities for shipbuilding and naval operations.

The proceeds of the office were considerable, to the tune of 150,000 kuruş, and led to intense competition among the Phanariotes to fill it. This competition involved extensive bribery of Ottoman officials, which was then recuperated from the Christian population by a special levy known as 'contribution to the new dragoman' (βοήθεια της νέας δραγομανίας). As the office often changed hands with great frequency, this became a great burden on the ordinary people. The dragoman also had a staff, which was also paid from impositions on the islands: a deputy (Turkish vekil, Greek βεκίλης), a correspondence secretary, and a messenger.

Their role in the administration of the Aegean islands was considerable, as they had the right to apportion taxation, as well as supervise the autonomous local administrations by judging cases themselves or appointing appeal judges. They could impose various fines and penalties, up to the death penalty, which however required the consent of the Kapudan Pasha. Apart from their administrative duties, the dragomans actively promoted education, made donations to churches, codified the customary law of the islands, and intervened in disputes between Orthodox and Catholic islanders.

== List of Dragomans of the Fleet ==
Name	Portrait	Tenure	Notes
Ioannakis Porfyritis		1701–1710	
Constantine Ventoura		1713–1731	
Georgios Ramadani		1731–1743	
Nicholas Mavrogenes		1744–1750; 1756–1759	Subsequently, Prince of Wallachia (1786–1789)
Stefanos Dimakis		1762–1763	
Constantine Mourouzis		1764–1765	Subsequently, Dragoman of the Porte (1774–1777)
Stefanos Mavrogenes		1765	
Nicholas Rosetti		1765–1767	
Manuel Argyropoulos		1767–1768	
Constantine Hangerli		1790–1797	Subsequently, Prince of Wallachia (1797–1799)
Alexandros Soutzos		1797–1799	Subsequently, Dragoman of the Porte (1799–1801), Prince of Moldavia (1801–1802) and of Wallachia (1819–1821).
John N. Caradja		1799–1800	Subsequently, Dragoman of the Porte (1808).
Panagiotis Mourouzis		1803–1806	Subsequently, Dragoman of the Porte (1809–1812).
Michael Hangerli		1806–1807	1st term.
Iakovos Argyropoulos		1809	Subsequently, Dragoman of the Porte (1812–1815)
Michael Hangerli		1810–1811	2nd term.
Constantine Mavrogenes		1811–1816	
Michael Manos		1816–1818	
Nicholas Mourouzis		1818–1821	son of Alexander Mourozis

== Sources ==
- Eliot, Charles (1900). Turkey in Europe. London: Edward Arnold.
- Pallis, A. A. (1964). "The Phanariots – A Greek aristocracy under Turkish rule". Greek Miscellany: A Collection of Essays on Mediaeval and Modern Greece. Athens. pp. 102–124.
- Philliou, Christine M. (2011). Biography of an Empire: Governing Ottomans in an Age of Revolution. Berkeley, Los Angeles and London: University of California Press. ISBN 978-0-520-26633-9.
- Vakalopoulos, Apostolos E. (1973). Ιστορία του νέου ελληνισμού, Τόμος Δ′: Τουρκοκρατία 1669–1812 – Η οικονομική άνοδος και ο φωτισμός του γένους (Έκδοση Β′) [History of modern Hellenism, Volume IV: Turkish rule 1669–1812 – Economic upturn and enlightenment of the nation (2nd Edition)] (in Greek). Thessaloniki: Emm. Sfakianakis & Sons.
