= Louis Dupré (painter) =

French Orientalist and Philhellene painter (1789–1837)

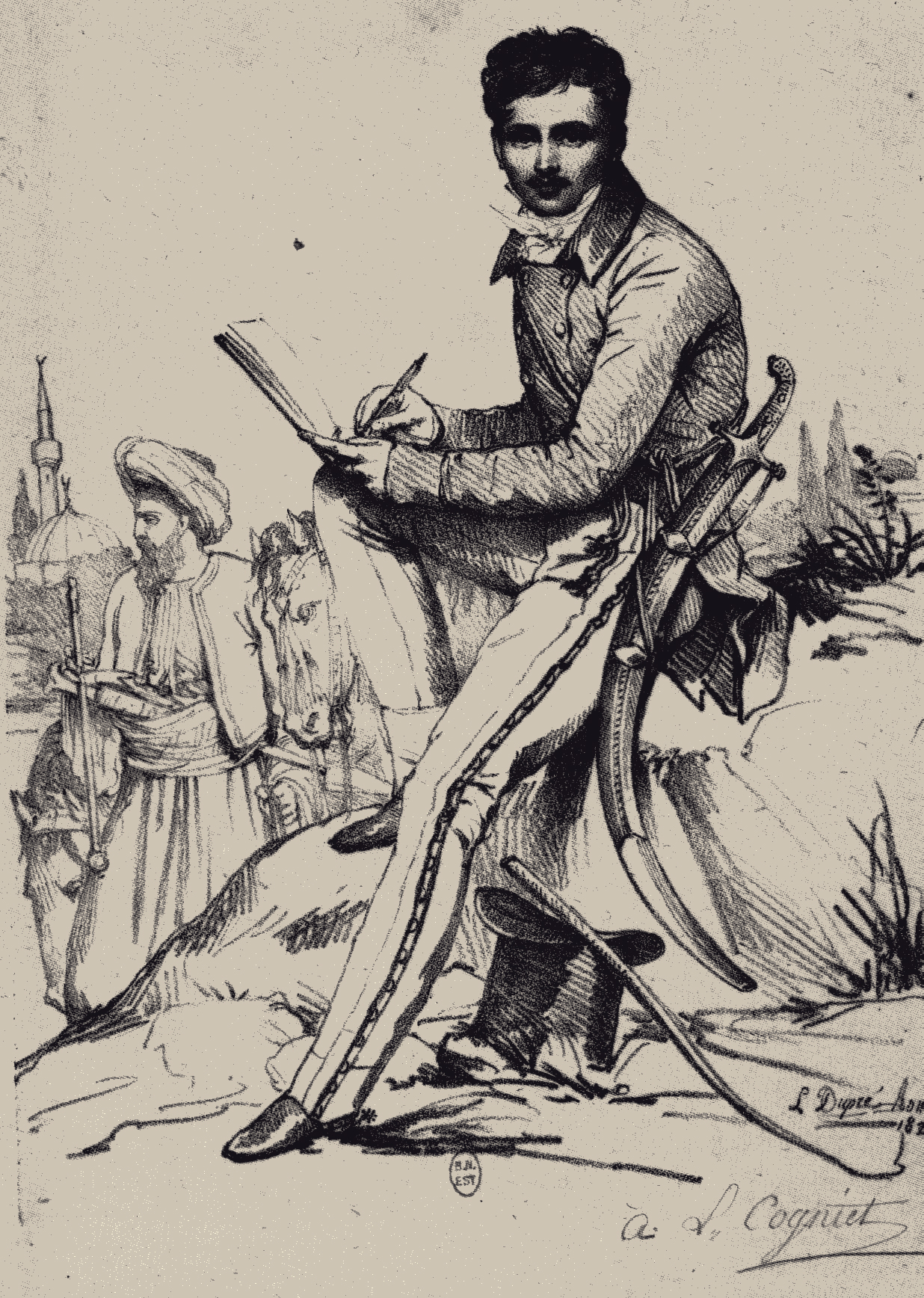
Dupré's 1821 self-portrait, depicting himself in Constantinople, in the act of making a drawing of the environment while wearing a curved Turkish sword.

Louis Dupré (French pronunciation: [lwi dypʁe]; Versailles, 9 January 1789 – Paris, 12 October 1837) was a French painter, lithographer, and travel writer, especially noted for his travels in Albania, Armenia, Greece, and other regions within the Ottoman Empire, and for his numerous paintings with Orientalist and Philhellene themes. He travelled and worked primarily in Greece on the very eve of the Greek War of Independence (1821–1832).

== Biography ==
Louis Dupré had been a student of the Neoclassical French painter Jacques-Louis David and had later worked as a painter for Jérôme Bonaparte, receiving commissions from the French court. Dupré had studied painting in Italy and had also received commissions during his travels there.

He travelled to Ottoman Greece, during a time when the country's ancient ideals and Hellenistic culture had experienced a revival among the Greek population. It also represented a concerning time for the Ottoman Empire, in terms of keeping their territorial regions under control. His visit to Greece was on the very eve of the Greek War of Independence (1821–1832), which led to the Greek victory and establishment of the First Hellenic Republic (1822–1832) and its successor state, the Kingdom of Greece (1832–1924).

He often traveled and changed his work location, including Paris, Kassel (1811–1814), Naples (1814–1816), Rome (1816–1819, 1824–1831), Naples (1819–1820), Constantinople (c. 1820), Greece (c. 1820), Paris (1820–1837), and Vienna (1820–1824).

== Travel book ==
Dupré visited Greece in 1819, while it was still a region within the Ottoman Empire, and recorded his time there with drawings and descriptions of the people from the different levels of society. His travel book, named Voyage à Athènes et à Constantinople, was produced a few years later after his travels, in 1825. It was written in French and published in the Restored Kingdom of France, after Greece had begun its revolution for independence and rebelled against the Ottoman Empire. His travel book consists of forty illustrations accompanied by fifty-two pages of text.

== Gallery ==
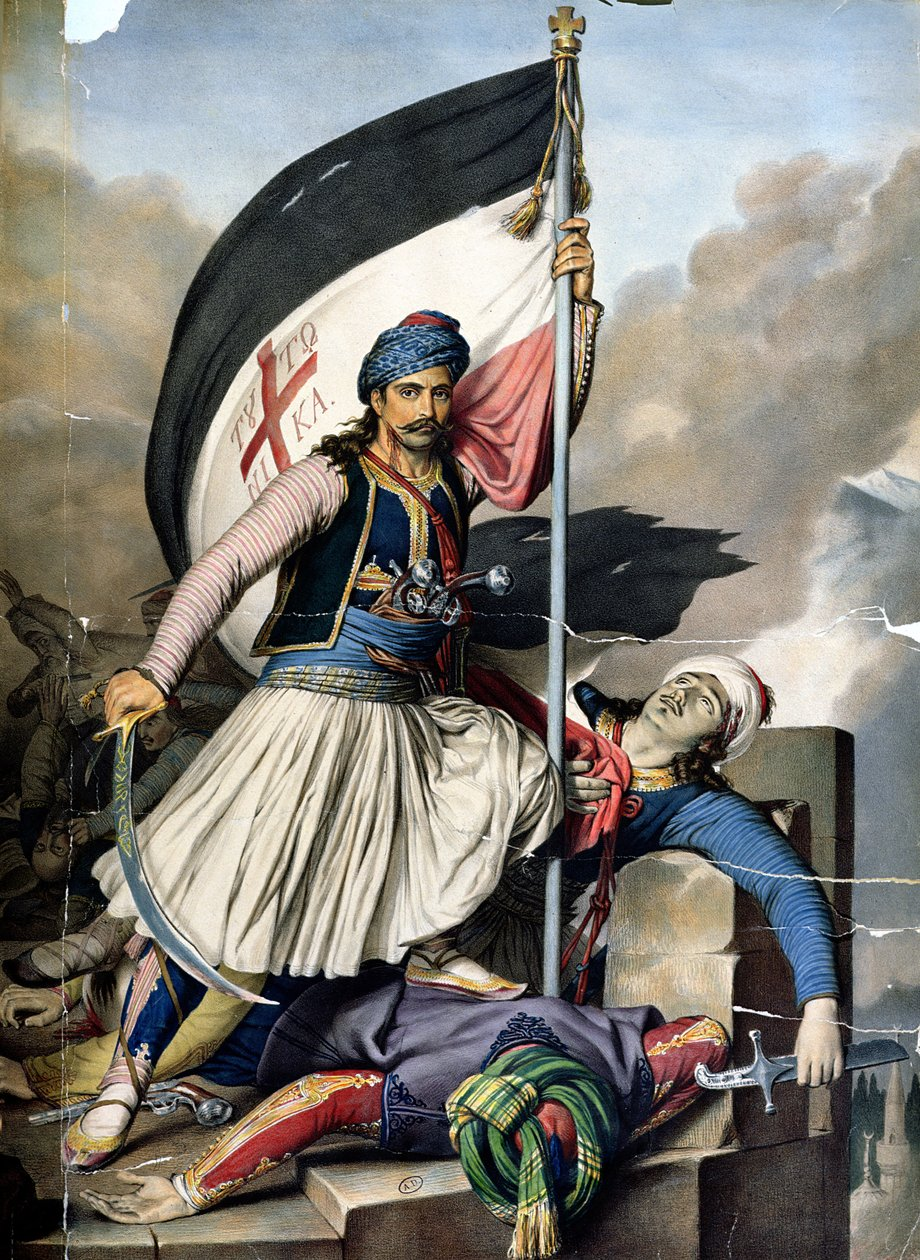
Dupré's depiction of Nikolakis Mitropoulos raising his flag at Salona; a scene from the early stages of the Greek War of Independence in 1821.

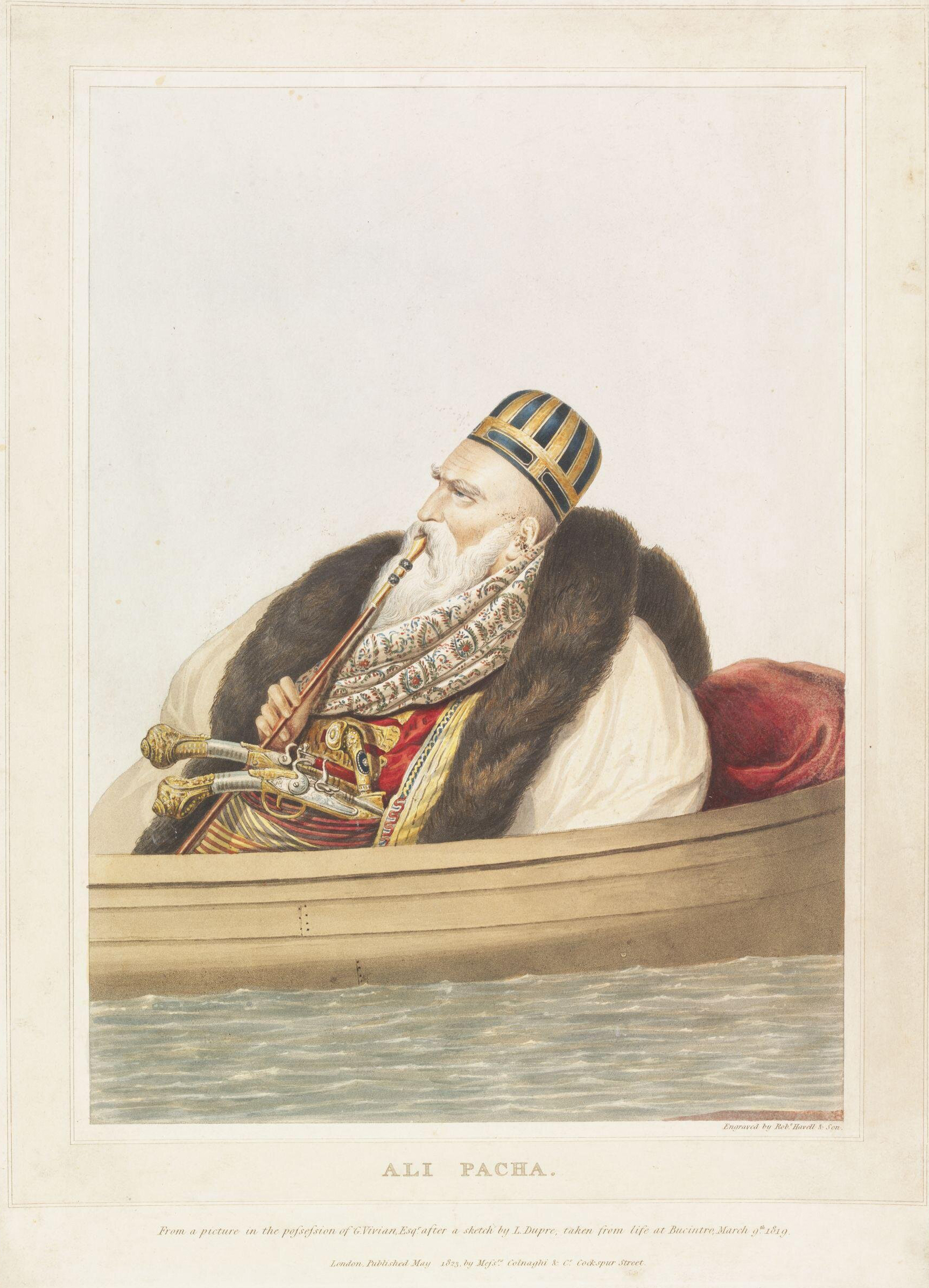
A hand-coloured lithograph by Louis Dupré in his travel book, Voyage à Athènes et à Constantinople, plate VII. Depicted here is Ali Pasha, Albanian ruler of the Pashalik of Yanina.

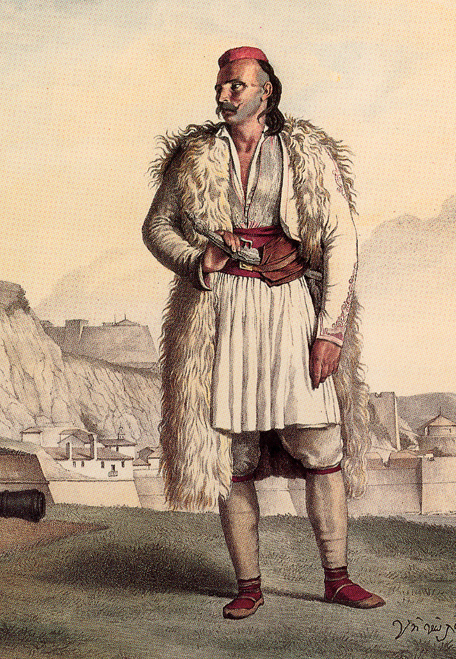
A hand-coloured lithograph by Louis Dupré in his travel book, Voyage à Athènes et à Constantinople, 1820s. Depicted here is a Souliote warrior of the Greek Legion in Corfu.

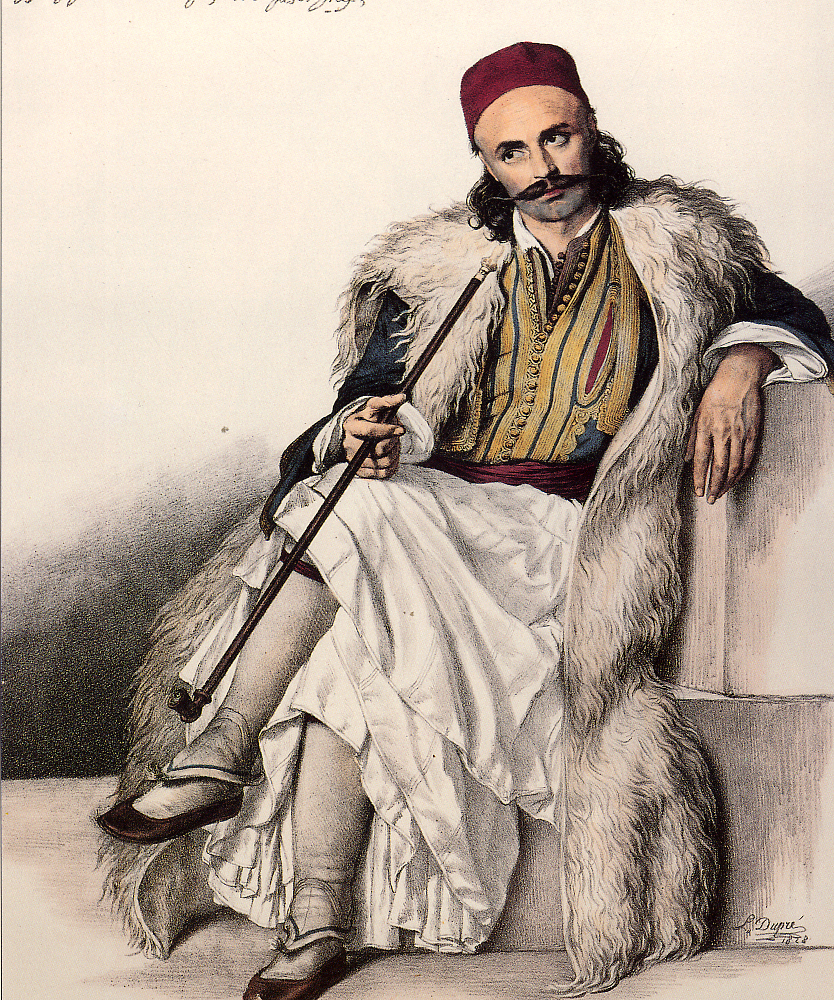
Vasilis Goudas, adjutant of Markos Botsaris. A hand-coloured lithograph by Louis Dupré in his travel book, Voyage à Athènes et à Constantinople, 1820s.

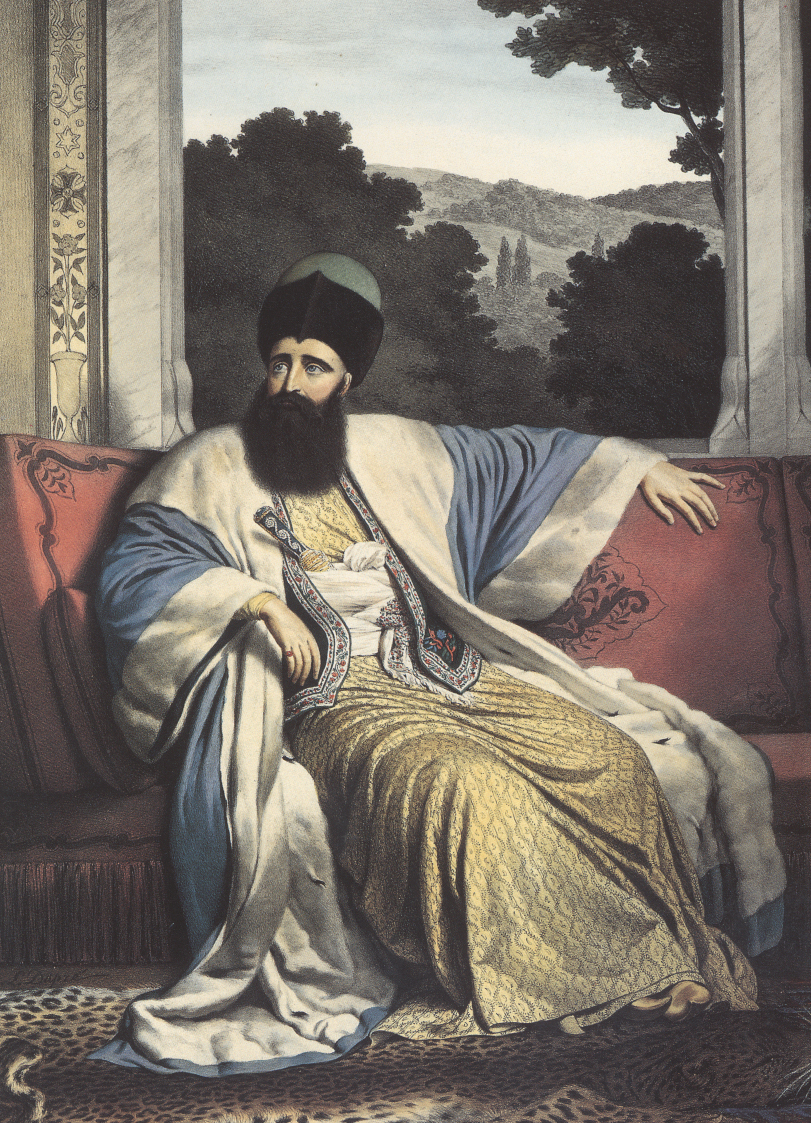
A hand-coloured lithograph by Louis Dupré in his travel book, Voyage à Athènes et à Constantinople. Depicted here is the Prince of Moldavia, Michael Soutzos.

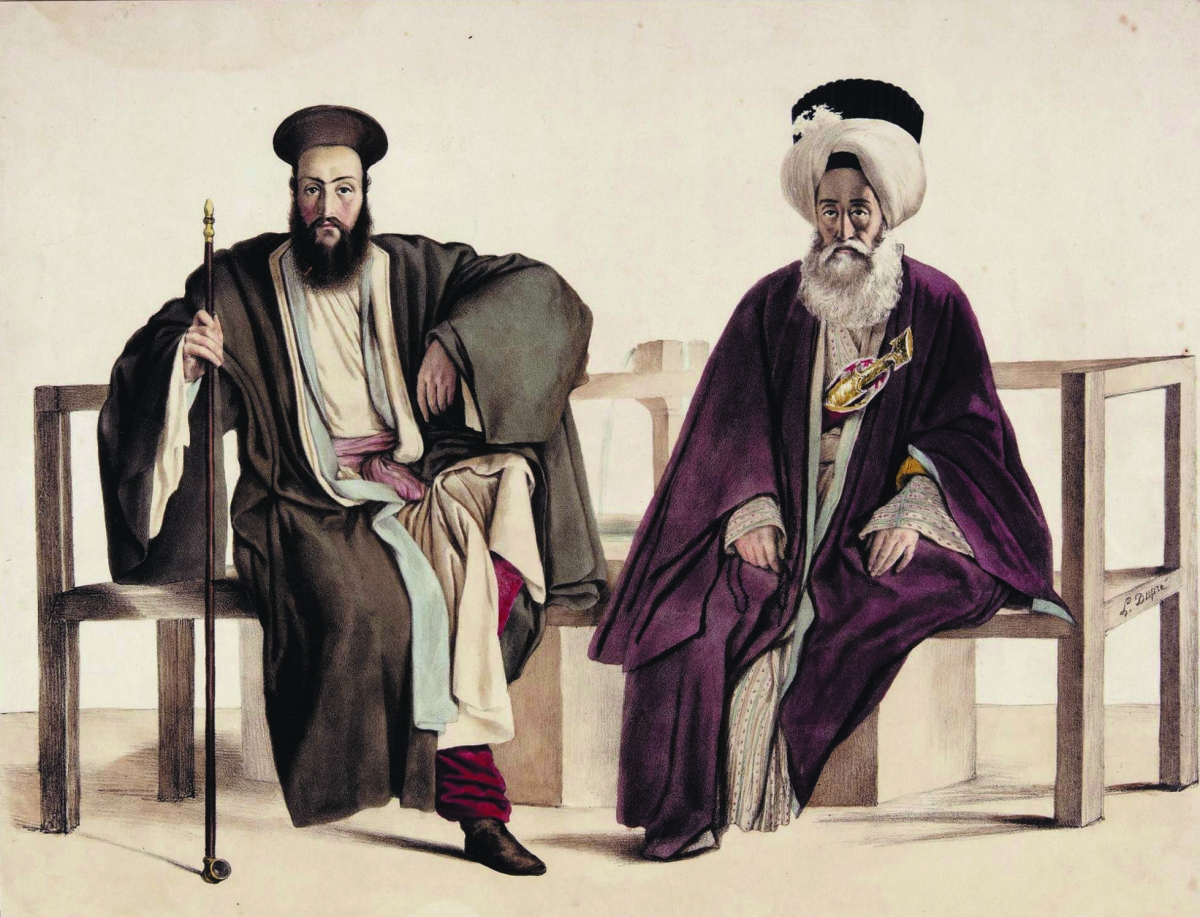
A hand-coloured lithograph by Louis Dupré in his travel book, Voyage à Athènes et à Constantinople. Depicted here are a Greek Orthodox priest (left) and a Turk (right).

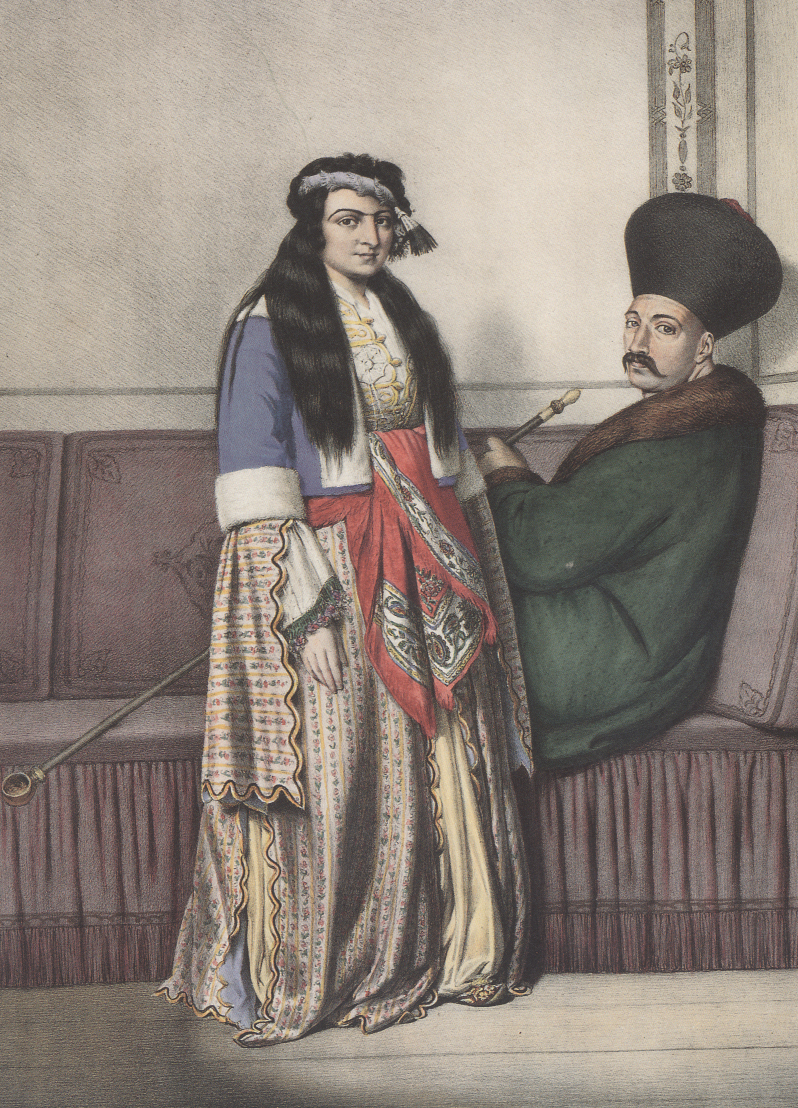
A hand-coloured lithograph by Louis Dupré in his travel book, Voyage à Athènes et à Constantinople. Depicted here are an Armenian and his wife.

== Bibliography ==
- Elisabeth A. Fraser, "Skin of Nation, Body of Empire: Louis Dupré in Ottoman Greece," in Mediterranean Encounters: Artists Between Europe and the Ottoman Empire, 1774–1839, Penn State University Press, 2017. ISBN 978-0-271-07320-0
- Tregaskis, Hugh (1979). Beyond the Grand Tour: The Levant Lunatics. Ascent Books. ISBN 0-9064-0702-8.
