= John Mavrocordatos =

Prince of Wallachia
- Reign: 2 December 1716 – 23 February 1719
- Predecessor: Nicholas Mavrocordatos
- Successor: Nicholas Mavrocordatos
- Born: 23 July 1684; Constantinople
- Died: 23 February 1719 (aged 34); Bucharest
- Father: Alexander Mavrocordatos
- Mother: Soultana Chrysoskolaiou
- Religion: Orthodox

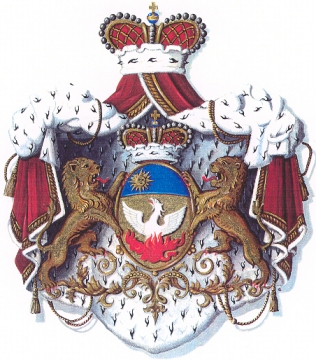
Coat of arms of the princes Mavrocordatos

John Mavrocordatos (Greek: Ιωάννης Μαυροκορδάτος, Romanian: Ioan Mavrocordat; 23 July 1684 – 23 February 1719) was caimacam of Moldavia (7 October 1711 – 16 November 1711) and Prince of Wallachia between 2 December 1716 and 23 February 1719. He was a member of the Mavrocordatos family.

== Life ==
Youngest son of Alexander Mavrocordatos, he was a faithful assistant to the political rise of his brother Nicholas Mavrocordatos. He replaced him as Grand Logothete of the Patriarchate of Constantinople and then as Grand Dragoman of the Sublime Porte from 1710 to 1717.

In 1711 with the simple title "Caimacam" he held the interregnum in Moldavia after Dimitrie Cantemir's flight and before his brother's restoration. He then replaced his brother on the throne of Wallachia by the order of Sultan Ahmed III after he was taken captive in the raid on Bucharest. Nicholas' captivity lasted from November 1716 to February 1719.

John Mavrocordatos had married in 1709 Zaphira Guliano, daughter of Demetrius Guliano, Grand Logothete of the Patriarchate of Constantinople, with issue including :

- Alexander (1710–1738)

He is not to be confused with his nephew John (Ioannes) Mavrocordatos (1712-1747), Prince of Moldavia between 1743 and 1747

== Sources ==
- Sturdza, Alexandre A.C. (1913). L'Europe Orientale et le rôle historique des Maurocordato (1660-1830) [Eastern Europe and the historic role of the Mavrocordato]. Paris: Plon. pp. 119–126.
- Legrand, Emile (1900). Généalogie des Maurocordatos de Constantinople. Paris: J. Maisonneuve. pp. 14, 26.

Preceded by Nicholas Mavrocordatos	Grand Dragoman of the Porte; 1709–1717	Succeeded by Grigore II Ghica
Preceded by Lupu Costachi	Caimacam of Moldavia; 7 October 1711 – 16 November 1711	Succeeded by Nicholas Mavrocordatos
Preceded by Nicholas Mavrocordatos	Prince/Voivode of Wallachia; 2 December 1716 – 6 March 1719	Succeeded by Nicholas Mavrocordatos
