= Panagiotis Nikousios =

Phanariote Greek physician (1613–1673)

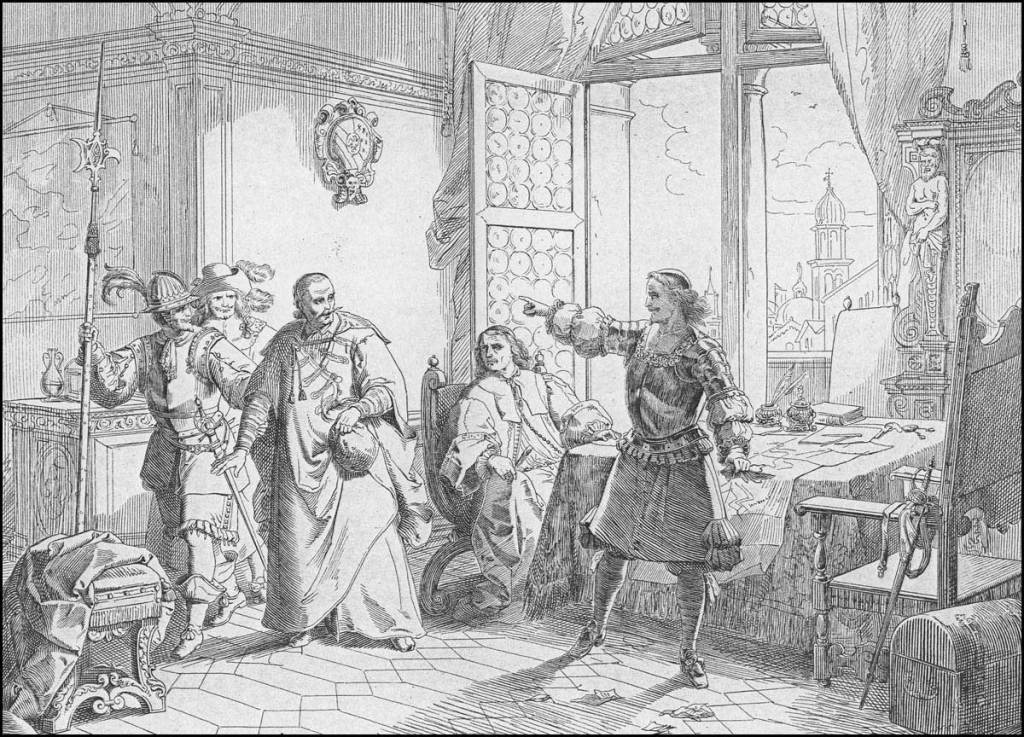
Imaginary depiction by Giuseppe Lorenzo Gatteri of the rejection of the Ottoman surrender proposals at Candia, brought by Nikousios (third from left) to the Venetian commander, Francesco Morosini

Panagiotis Nikousios (Greek: Παναγιώτης Νικούσιος; 1613 – 2 October 1673) was a Phanariote Greek physician and the first Christian Grand Dragoman (chief interpreter) of the Ottoman Porte, holding the office from c. 1661 to his death in 1673. Nikousios was very well educated, having received instruction by the Jesuits in Chios, and gone on to attend the Patriarchal Academy in Constantinople and the University of Padua, where he studied medicine. On his return, he became personal physician to Köprülüzade Fazıl Ahmed Pasha, and when the latter became Grand Vizier in 1661, he appointed Nikousios as the first Grand Dragoman. He played an important role in the negotiations that ended the long Siege of Candia in 1669, and amassed a great library with many valuable manuscripts. His appointment as Grand Dragoman marks the start of the Phanariotes' rise to high political offices in the Ottoman government.

He also played a major role in securing, via edict of Sultan Mehmed IV, possession of the Church of the Holy Sepulchre and the other Christian holy sites in the Holy Land for the Greek Orthodox Patriarchate of Jerusalem. After his death in 1673, this document was put forward against the rival claims of the Catholics, supported by the French ambassador, the Marquis de Nointel. Nikousios apparently married twice, the first time around 1655 to a lady from the Cantacuzino family, with whom he had a son and a daughter. While the son managed to quickly waste his father's enormous fortune, the daughter married the wealthy merchant Asimakis Mourouzis, and was the grandmother of the Grand Dragoman and Prince of Wallachia, Constantine Mourouzis. Nikousios' second wife hailed from the Genoese-Chian noble Calvocoressis family.

Nikousios died on 2 October 1673 (O.S.) while accompanying the Grand Vizier on campaign. He was buried in the monastery of the Theotokos that he had founded on Halki.

== Sources ==
- Hering, Gunnar (1994). "Panagiotis Nikousios als Dragoman der kaiserlichen Gesandtschaft in Konstantinopel". Jahrbuch der österreichischen Byzantinistik (in German). 44: 143–178.
- Vassa Kontouma, «Londres ou Paris ? Les affinités électives de Dosithée II de Jérusalem dans ses premiers projets éditoriaux», Livres et confessions chrétiennes orientales. Une histoire connectée entre l'Empire ottoman, le monde slave et l'Occident (XVIe-XVIIIe siècles), Brepols 2023. ISBN 978-2-503-60440-4.
- Stamatiadis, Epameinondas (1865). Βιογραφίαι τῶν Ἑλλήνων Μεγάλων Διερμηνέων τοῡ Ὀθωμανικοῡ Κράτους [Biographies of the Greek Great Dragomans of the Ottoman State] (in Greek). Athens: K. Tefarikis.

| New title | Grand Dragoman of the Porte; 1661–1673 | Succeeded by Alexander Mavrokordatos the Exaporite |
