= Ishak Efendi =

Ottoman mathematician and engineer

Hoca Ishak Efendi (c. 1774 – 1835) was an Ottoman mathematician and engineer.

== Life ==
Ishak Efendi was born in Arta (now in Greece), probably in 1774, to a Jewish family. His father had converted to Islam. After his father died, he went to Constantinople, where he studied mathematics and foreign languages, learning French, Latin, Greek and Hebrew alongside Turkish, Arabic and Persian.

As part of Sultan Mahmud II's attempts to modernize the Ottoman Empire, in 1815 or 1816 he was appointed instructor (hence his title of hoca, lit. 'master, teacher') at the Imperial School of Military Engineering (predecessor of the Istanbul Technical University). In July 1824 he was also named as interpreter (dragoman) to the Sublime Porte in succession to Yahya Efendi, a post he held until 1828/9, when he was dismissed, possibly due to fears by the secretary of state (reis ül-küttab) Pertev Pasha that he might replace him. During the Russo-Turkish War of 1828-29, Ishak Efendi spent some time supervising the construction of fortresses, before resuming his teaching post at the Imperial School of Military Engineering, where he rose to become Head Instructor (başhoca) in December 1830/January 1831. As Head Instructor, he tried with some success to reform the curriculum and raise the educational level of the faculty, but his influential predecessor, Seyyid Ali Pasha, managed through his connections at court to have him sent to Medina on the pretext of going to the Hajj, as well as to supervise various restorations to the holy sites there. During his return to Istanbul in 1834 or 1835, he died at Suez, where he was buried.

== Work ==
His main work, the Madjmuʿa-i ʿUlum-i Riyaziyye ("Collected Works on Mathematical Sciences"), was a four-volume text published between 1831 and 1834. It contained translations, mostly of contemporary French works, on mathematics, physics, chemistry and geology, and played a crucial role in introducing many contemporary scientific concepts to the Muslim world: according to the Encyclopedia of Islam, it was "the first work in Turkish on the modern physical and natural sciences", being credited with introducing the "scientific terminology, based on Arabic, which was used in Turkey up to the 1930s and in some Arab countries still later". He also wrote a number of works, again mainly translated from European treatises, on engineering and military science.

== Sources ==
- Erbahar, Aksel (2010). "Ishak Efendi, Hoca". In Stillman, Norman A. (ed.). Encyclopedia of Jews in the Islamic World.
- Kuran, E. (1978). "ḳh̲od̲j̲a Isḥāḳ Efendi". In van Donzel, E.; Lewis, B.; Pellat, Ch. & Bosworth, C. E. (eds.). The Encyclopaedia of Islam, Second Edition. Volume IV: Iran–Kha. Leiden: E. J. Brill. pp. 112–113. doi:10.1163/1573-3912_islam_SIM_3619. ISBN 978-90-04-05745-6. OCLC 758278456.
- Lewis, Bernard (1968). The Emergence of Modern Turkey (2nd ed.). London: Oxford University Press.
