= Dragoman =

Arab interpreter of Eurasian languages

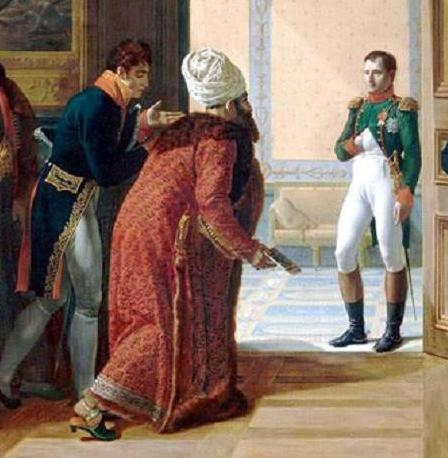
Amédée Jaubert (left) was Napoleon's "favourite orientalist adviser and dragoman". He accompanied the Persian envoy Mirza Mohammad-Reza Qazvini at Finckenstein Palace to meet with Napoleon on 27 April 1807 for the Treaty of Finckenstein. Detail of a painting by François Mulard.

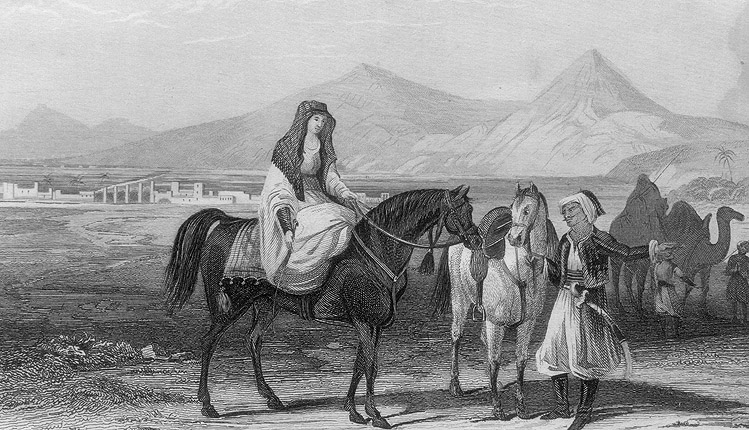
Plate from The Crescent and the Cross by Elliot Warburton entitled "Encampment at Baalbec, lady and dragoman in foreground."

A dragoman (ترجمان) was an interpreter, translator, and official guide between Turkish-, Arabic-, and Persian-speaking countries and polities of the Middle East and European embassies, consulates, vice-consulates and trading posts. A dragoman had to have a knowledge of Arabic, Persian, Turkish, and European languages.

In the Ottoman Empire, dragomans were mainly members of the Ottoman Greek community, who possessed considerable multilingual skills, because Greek trading communities did substantial business in the markets of the Mediterranean Sea, the Black Sea, the Atlantic Ocean, and the Indian Ocean. To a lesser extent, other communities with international commercial links, notably the Armenians, were recruited.

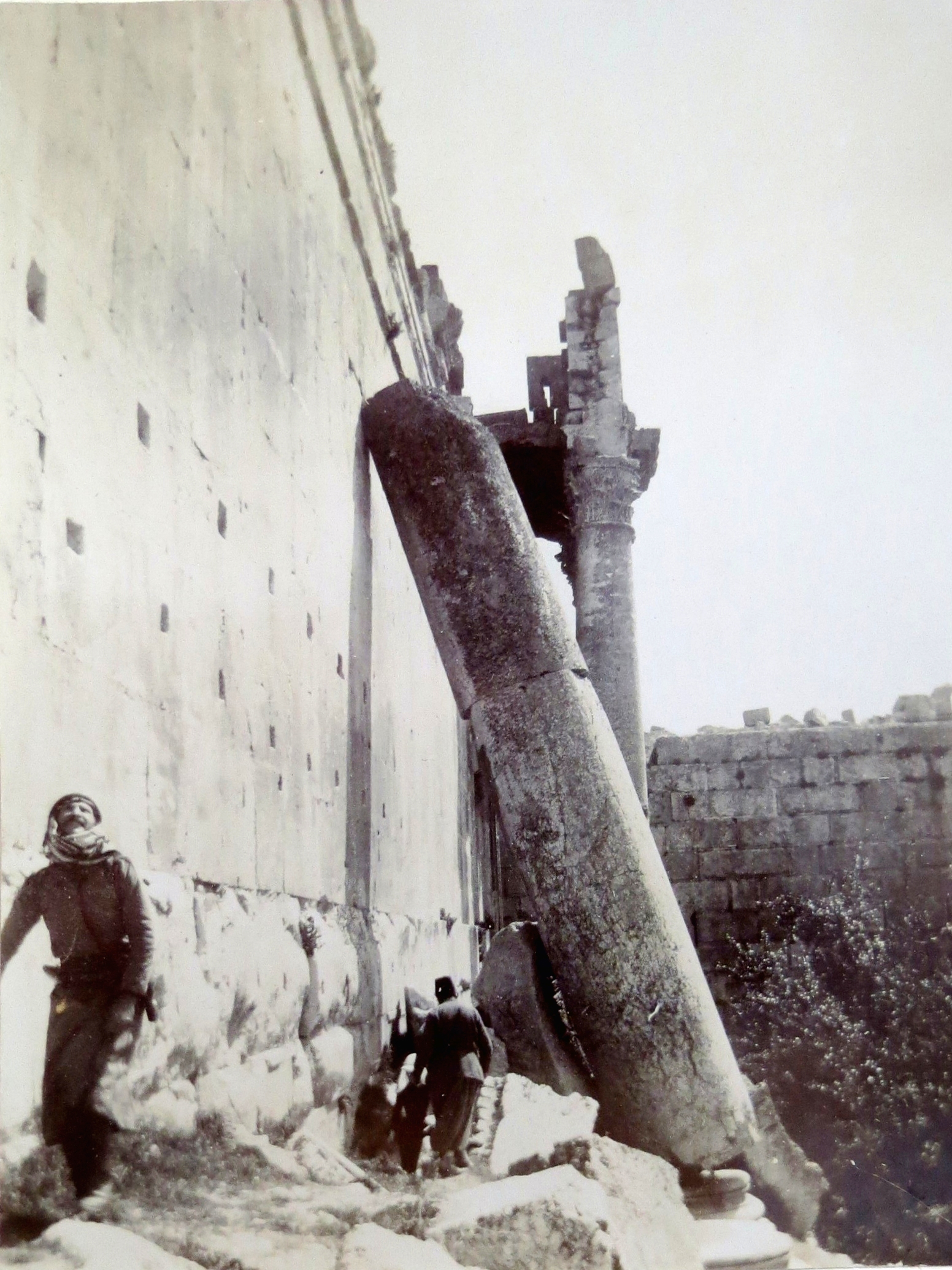
Dragoman Joseph Shaar. Temple of Jupiter, Baalbek, 1891

== Etymology and variants ==
In Arabic the word is ترجمان (tarjumān), in Turkish tercüman. Deriving from the Semitic quadriliteral root t-r-g-m, it appears in Akkadian as "targumannu," in Ge'ez (Classical Ethiopic) as ትርጓም (t-r-gw-m), and in Aramaic as targemana. Hebrew makes a distinction between מתרגם (metargem)—referring to a translator of written texts—and מתורגמן (meturgeman) referring to an interpreter of spoken conversation or speeches. The latter is obviously more closely related to the other languages mentioned, though both are derived from the same Semitic root. There has been speculation of a Hittite origin of the term (Salonen, p. 12; Rabin, pp. 134–136).

During the Middle Ages the word entered European languages: in Middle English as dragman, from Old French drugeman, from Medieval Latin as dragumannus, from Middle Greek δραγομάνος, dragoumanos. Later European variants include the German trutzelmann, the French trucheman or truchement (in post-Tanzimat French, and in modern French it is drogman), the Italian turcimanno, and the Spanish trujamán, trujimán and truchimán; these variants point to a Turkish or Arabic word "turjuman", with different vocalization. Webster's Dictionary of 1828 lists dragoman as well as the variants drogman and truchman in English.

Consequently, the plural, in English, is "dragomans" (not "dragomen").

== History ==
In the Turkish tradition, the dragoman position is recorded in the pre-Ottoman Sultanate of Rum during the 13th-century reign of Keykubad I when two dragomans and two translator clerks were appointed.

=== In the Ottoman Empire ===
In Ottoman records, the first imperial dragoman recorded was Lutfi Pasha, who was sent to Venice in 1479 to deliver a treaty.

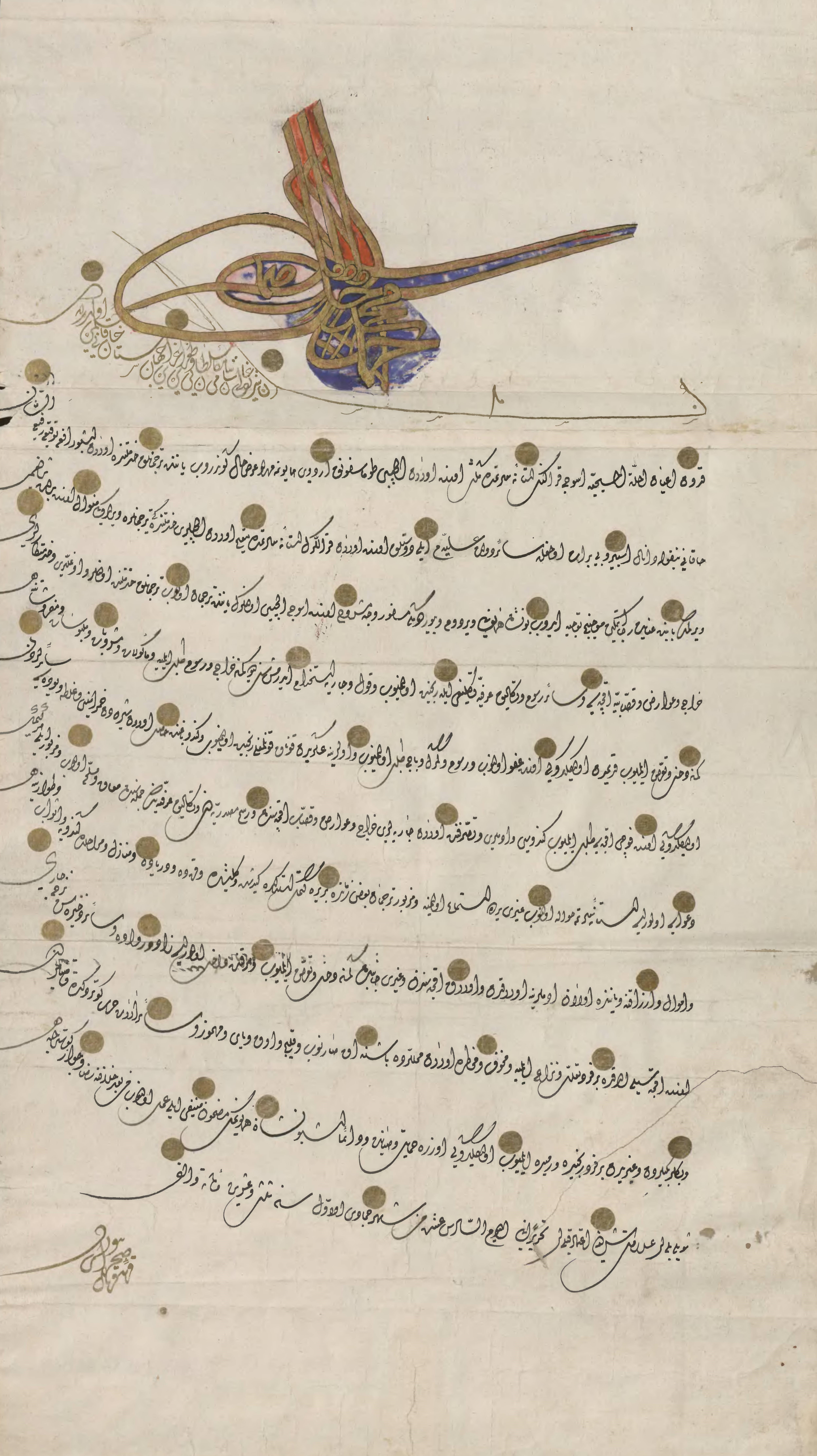
Letter issued by Sultan Ahmed III assigning Nicola Danal Spiro as dragoman to Thomas Funck, Swedish envoyée to the Ottoman court.

The position took particular prominence in the Ottoman Empire, where demand for the mediation provided by dragomans is said to have been created by the resistance on the part of the Muslim Ottomans to learn the languages of non-Muslim nations. The office incorporated diplomatic as well as linguistic duties—namely, in the Porte's relation with Christian countries—and some dragomans thus came to play crucial roles in Ottoman politics. The profession tended to be dominated by ethnic Greeks, including the first Ottoman dragoman of the Sublime Porte, Panagiotis Nikousios, the official interpreter for the Divan (Imperial Council) of the sultan, and his successor Alexander Mavrocordatos. But this dominance changed in 1821 with the start of the Greek War of Independence.

In 1821 the chief dragoman Constantine Mourouzi was executed for suspected disloyalty, and his successor, Stavraki Aristarchi, was dismissed and exiled in 1822. With unanswered correspondence accumulating, the chief naval instructor, one Ishak Efendi, took over the position and became a pioneer in translation of Western scientific literature into Turkish, a task for which he had to create an entirely new vocabulary. Following Ishak, the grand dragoman and his staff were Muslims, and the Translation Office (Tercüme Odası, "Translation Room", in Turkish), with its familiarity with things European, became a new major ladder to influence and power in the Tanzimat era; this knowledge largely replaced the older ladders of the army, the bureaucracy, and the religious establishment in the mid- and late-19th century.

The dragomans were exempt from taxation. As many of them were Jewish, in virtue of their proficiency in foreign languages, Jewish Halakhic responsa dealt with the question whether or not these dragomans were exempt also from the internal taxes of the Jewish community.

It became customary that most hospodars of the Phanariote rule (roughly 1711–1821) over the Danubian Principalities (Moldavia and Wallachia) would previously have occupied this Ottoman office, a fact which did not prevent many of them from joining conspiracies that aimed to overthrow Turkish rule over the area.

=== Western dragomans ===
These men were instrumental in spreading a wide-ranging curiosity about Islamic culture throughout the Latin parts of Europe during the 17th and 18th centuries. The dragomans had scholarly language training in Persian, Arabic and Turkish since they were translators, interpreters, authors and were very open to the material and fashionable intricacies of the Ottoman culture.

The first French translation of the Quran was done by André du Ryer, in 1647. He was from the French consulate in Egypt. Another, Cosmo of Carbognano, from the Naples embassy, published in Latin: The Principles of Turkish Grammar for The Use of Apostolic Missionaries in Constantinople (Rome 1794).

As a highly trained group of diplomatic professionals, they were employed by Europeans in embassies and consulates, not only translating and interpreting items but often meeting with Ottoman officials without their employer being present. An 18th-century Venetian ambassador described the dragomans as ‘the tongue that speaks, the ear that hears, the eye that sees, the hand that gives, the spirit that acts, and on whom the life and success of every negotiation may depend.

There was huge success from the published translation of Thousand And One Nights, by Antoine Galland (1646–1715). He was attached to the embassy of Charles Marie François Olier, marquis de Nointel, a Parisian who was a councilor to the Parlement of Paris, and a French ambassador to the Ottoman court, 1670 to 1679.

One who created a large European interest in the history of Islam, with his published Geschichte des osmanischen Reiches was Joseph von Hammer-Purgstall of Austria, a student at the Diplomatic Academy of Vienna (the academy was initially established by Empress Maria Theresa in 1754 as "The Oriental Academy" to train young diplomats to represent the Habsburg Empire abroad).

== See also ==
- Translation Office (Ottoman Empire)
- List of dragomans
- Reis Effendi
- Dragoman of the Porte
- Dragoman of the Fleet
