= Vassa Kontouma =

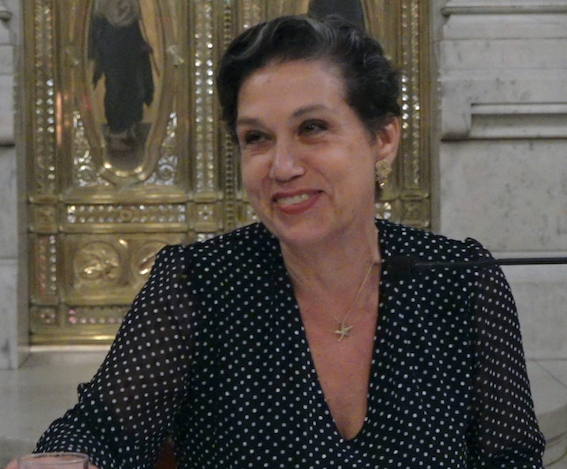
- Kontouma in 2022
- Born: 1967 (age 58–59); Boulogne, France

Academic work
- Discipline: history
- Sub-discipline: Byzantine studies
- Main interests: De Fide orthodoxa; John of Damascus; Byzantine chants

Vassa Kontouma or Vassa Kontouma-Conticello, born in Boulogne in 1967, is a Franco-Greek historian and Byzantinist. She specializes in the history of ideas within the Byzantine and post-Byzantine world, particularly focusing on theological questions. She is also an expert on specific authors, such as John of Damascus.

== Biography ==
She was born in Boulogne in 1967 to Greek parents. She traveled to numerous European countries before returning to France in 1984. Kontouma then pursued studies in philosophy and oriental languages, eventually completing a thesis on the theology of John of Damascus under the supervision of Pierre Magnard. Her research focused on his treatise "De Fide orthodoxa", which remained one of her ongoing subjects of research. She has been teaching at the École pratique des hautes études (EPHE) since 1998, became a lecturer in 2012, and later became the dean of the section of religious sciences within the institution. In 2016, she also obtained her Habilitation. The historian serves as the president of the association of the French Institute of Byzantine Studies (IFEB).

In 2017, in collaboration with the French School at Athens, Xavier Bisaro, and Flora Kritikou, she organized a research project on the Byzantine chants of Candia (Venetian Crete), an art form that is relatively unknown but characterized by a close connection between Latin and Greek traditions. She is a specialist of John of Damascus, among others. Thus, alongside other scholars, she revisited the commonly accepted biography of John of Damascus, offering new interpretations of his life.

In collaboration with Eastern Orthodox Bishop Job Getcha, Kontouma contributed to an interreligious work to present Eastern Orthodox Christian theology. She was also involved in explaining her research, participating in discussions on platforms such as France Culture and France 2.
