= Soutzos family =

Soutzos arms, in the variant used by Konstantinos (Constantin Suțu), son of Michael Soutzos

The House of Soutzos or Soutsos (Greek: Σούτσος, Σούτζος; Romanian: Suțu, Sutzu) was a Phanariote family which grew into prominence and power in Constantinople (present-day Istanbul) during the last centuries of Ottoman Empire and gave several hospodars to the Danubian Principalities, like Alexandros Soutzos, Michael (I) Drakos Soutzos and Michael (II) Soutzos.

== History ==
The origins of the Soutzos family are unclear. The book Le Livre d'Or de la noblesse Phanariote, by Alexandre Negresco-Soutzo, wrote that the family was related to a Byzantine family of Draco Tipaldo. Some authors have accepted the noble Byzantine Greek descent of the family. According to Alexandros Rizos Rangavis, during the Byzantine period they belonged to the aristocracy and their surname was Draco (Drakos). the etymology of their new surname, Soutzos, might have come from "soudci" (sucu), which means "water carrier" in Turkish; some of their ancestors had perhaps taken the duties of plumbing or supplying water for Constantinople, which they later discharged.

The family's origin story begins with the head of the family, Drakos Soutzos, who came from an Epirus to Constantinople around 1400, returned to Epirus after the conquest of this city by Mehmed II and again returned to Constantinople in 1459, among the eighteen other great Greek families to whom the Sultan granted privileges and dignities. According to this story, the Soutzos family descended from the Drakos family.

Another suggested region of origin is also the island of Chios. Others write that they might've come from Bulgaria, but again with the surname "Drakos". The earliest known member of the family was a certain Diamantakis Drakos-Soutzos who served as Grand Rhetor of the Ecumenical Patriarchate.

After prince Mihai, his nephew Alexandru Suțu, and his namesake grandson Mihail Suțu also ruled as Princes.

Significant members of the family include the two brother poets Panagiotis Soutsos and Alexandros Soutsos, of whom the first set the cornerstone for the revival of the Olympic Games and the latter was the founder of the Greek Romantic school of poetry. The main branch of the above family is now found in Athens, Greece. Alexandru A. Suțu and Mihail C. Suțu both became members of the Romanian Academy in the 1880s.
