= Alexandros Soutzos =

Prince of Moldavia from 1801 to 1802

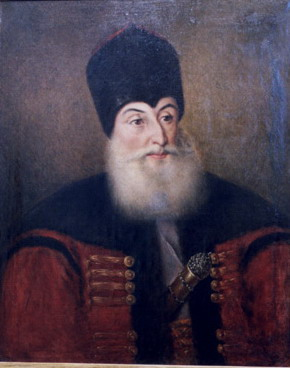

Prince of Moldavia
- Reign: 10 July 1801 – 1 October 1802
- Predecessor: Constantine Ypsilantis
- Successor: Iordache Cantacuzino

Prince of Wallachia (1st reign)
- Reign: 2 July 1802 – 30 August 1802
- Predecessor: Michael Soutzos
- Successor: Constantine Ypsilantis

Prince of Wallachia (2nd reign)
- Reign: 24 August 1806 – 15 October 1806
- Predecessor: Constantine Ypsilantis
- Successor: Constantine Ypsilantis

Prince of Wallachia (3rd reign)
- Reign: December 1806
- Predecessor: Constantine Ypsilantis
- Successor: Constantine Ypsilantis

Prince of Wallachia (4th reign)
- Reign: 17 November 1818 – 19 January 1821
- Predecessor: John Caradja
- Successor: Tudor Vladimirescu
- Born: 1758; Istanbul
- Died: 19 January 1821 (aged 62–63); Bucharest
- House: Soutzos family
- Religion: Orthodox

Alexandros Soutzos (Greek: Αλέξανδρος Σούτζος, Romanian: Alexandru Suţu, Turkish: Drakozâde Aleko Bey; 1758 – 18/19 January 1821) was a Phanariote Greek who ruled as Prince of Moldavia (July 10, 1801 – October 1, 1802 and Prince of Wallachia (July 2, 1802 – August 30, 1802; August 24, 1806 – October 15, 1806; December 1806; November 17, 1818 – January 19, 1821). Born in Constantinople, he had earlier been Grand Dragoman of the Ottoman Empire.

Preceded by Constantine Ypsilantis	Grand Dragoman of the Porte; 1799–1802	Succeeded by Alexandros M. Soutzos
Preceded by Constantine Ypsilantis	Prince of Moldavia; 1801–1802	Succeeded by vacancy
Preceded by Michael Soutzos	Prince of Wallachia; 1802	Succeeded by Constantine Ypsilantis
Preceded by Constantine Ypsilantis	Prince of Wallachia; 1806	Succeeded by Constantine Ypsilantis
Preceded by Constantine Ypsilantis	Prince of Wallachia; 1806	Succeeded by Constantine Ypsilantis
Preceded by vacancy before Jean Georges Caradja	Prince of Wallachia; 1818–1821	Succeeded by Tudor Vladimirescu
