= Die Welt des Islams =

- Discipline: Religious Studies, Islamic Studies
- Language: English, French, German

Publication details
- History: 1913 to present
- Publisher: Brill (Netherlands)

Standard abbreviations
- ISO 4: Welt Islams

Indexing
- ISSN: 0043-2539 (print); 1570-0607 (web)
- JSTOR: 00432539

Links
- Journal homepage; Online archive

Die Welt des Islams (German pronunciation: [diː ˈvɛlt dɛs ɪsˈlaːms]) or the International Journal for the Study of Modern Islam is an academic journal on Islam and the Muslim world published by Brill. The journal was started as an official organ of the German Society for Islamic Studies. It publishes articles in three languages—English, French, and German—and its German title translates into English as "The World of Islam" and French as "Le Monde de l'Islam". It was founded by Martin Hartmann in 1915 and is one of the oldest Western journals for the study of Islam, specialising in topics around Muslim civilisations since the late 18th century. It has published articles by C. H. Becker, Miriam Cooke, Maxime Rodinson, Annemarie Schimmel, Bernard Lewis, Hamid Algar, and Muhammad Hamidullah.
