= Michael Soutzos =

Prince of Moldavia from 1819 to 1821

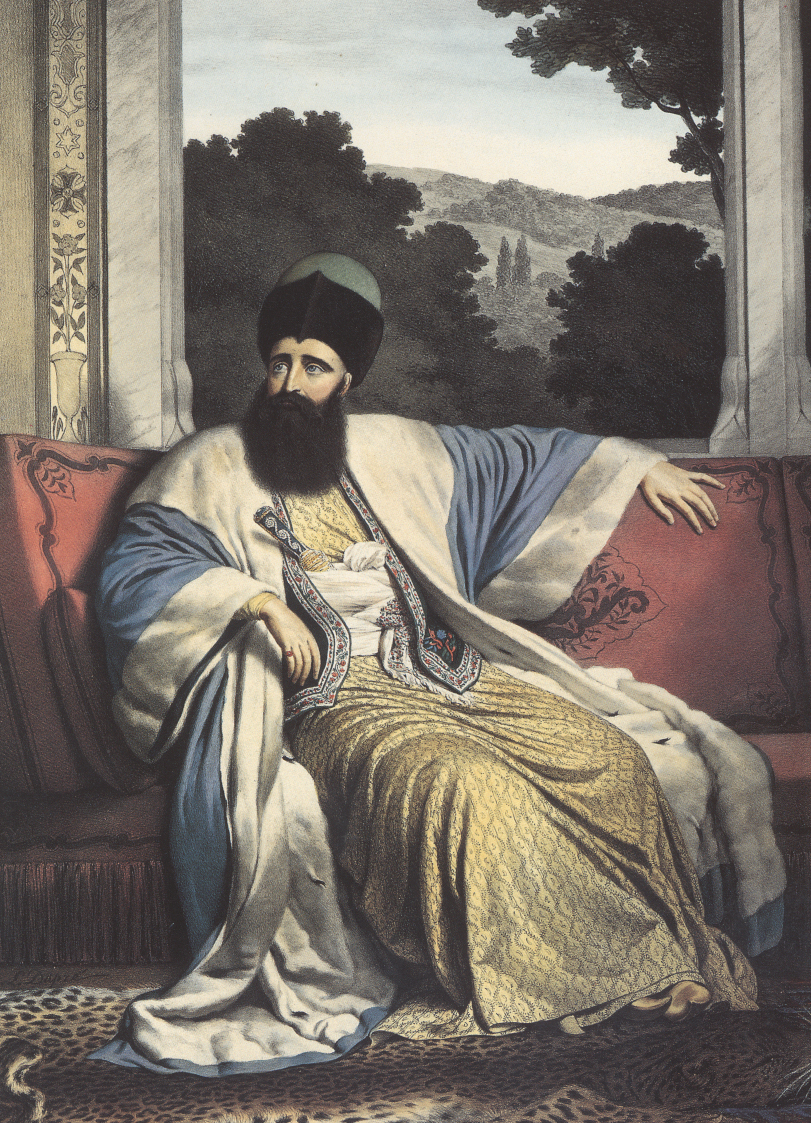
- Soutzos as hospodar of Moldavia, 1820

Prince of Moldavia
- Reign: 12 June 1819 – 29 March 1821
- Predecessor: Scarlat Callimachi
- Successor: Stolnici Manu and Rizo-Nerulos
- Born: 1778 or 1784; Constantinople, Ottoman Empire (now Istanbul, Turkey)
- Died: 12 June 1864 (aged 79–80 or 85–86); Athens, Kingdom of Greece (now Athens, Greece)
- House: Soutzos family
- Religion: Orthodox

Ambassador of the Kingdom of Greece to the Russian Empire
- In office 1834–1837
- Monarch: Otto I of Greece
- Prime Minister: Ioannis Kolettis; Josef Ludwig von Armansperg; Ignaz von Rudhart

Michael Soutzos (Greek: Μιχαήλ Σούτζος, Romanian: Mihail Suțu; 1778 or 1784 – 12 June 1864), was a Greek member of the Soutzos family of Phanariotes, he was the grandson of Michael Drakos Soutzos; he was in turn a Prince of Moldavia, between 12 June 1819 and 29 March 1821. He was initiated into Filiki Eteria, he supported the Greek revolution in Moldavia and Wallachia and after the creation of the Greek state, he served as ambassador of the country abroad.

== Biography ==
He was born in Constantinople in 1778 or according to other sources in 1784. His parents were the Phanariot Grigorios Soutzos and Sevasti Tedeskou. During his adolescence he lived in the court of his grandfather Michael Drakos Soutzos, who was ruler of Wallachia and later, he served as secretary to the Grand Dragoman of the Sublime Porte, John Caradja, whose daughter, Roxani, he married in 1812. In the same year, thanks to his knowledge of languages and the favor of his father in law, he was appointed to the position of the Grand Dragoman.

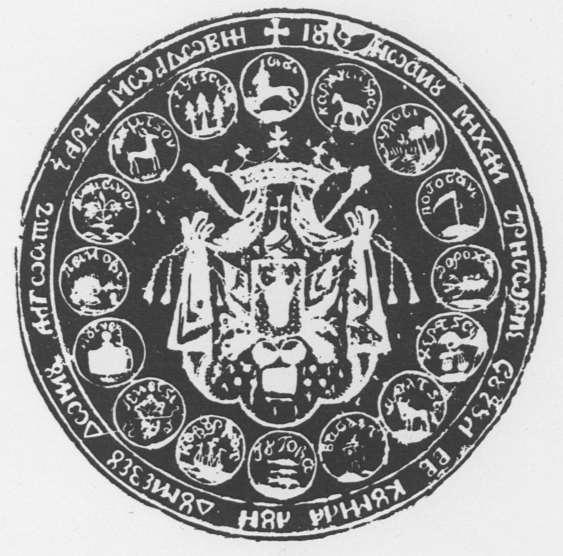
Seal of Michael Soutzos as prince of Moldavia

In 1819 he was placed by the sultan as ruler of Moldavia, position he held until 1821. He also had a position in the council of Sultan Mahmud II and he was one of the consultants that in 1820 supported the suppression of the rebellion of Ali Pasha. In November 1820 he was initiated into the Filiki Eteria by Iakovos Rizos Neroulos.

In January 1821, he finalized his collaboration with Alexander Ypsilantis and with the invasion of Ypsilantis in Moldova on 22 February, Michael Soutzos-Vodas raised the guard in command of the rebels and paid substantial amounts of money for the needs of the army. When after a short time, the movement in Moldova-Wallachia began to ebb, Soutzos forced under the pressure from the boyars, who declared him as downfallen by the time he had help the rebels and had repudiated Ottoman domination, to leave his position in Iași. At first, he moved at Skouleni and then (31 March 1821) in Chișinău of Russian Empire. During the same period the Ecumenical Patriarchate of Constantinople excommunicated him and Ypsilantis.

Soutzos in 1830

Thereafter, he tried to escape to Switzerland through Austrian Empire but there he was arrested and was imprisoned for almost four years. After his release, he fled first to Italy and then to Switzerland. There, he was hosted in Geneva by the Swiss Philhellene Jean-Gabriel Eynard. During his stay in Europe, he arranged for the collection and distribution of money in favor of the Greek War of Independence and he was in contact with the "Zakynthos Committee" of Dionysios Romas. Before the undertaking of the governance of Greece by Ioannis Kapodistrias, Soutzos was one of the possible candidates to occupy this position.

During Kapodistrias governance, he was appointed as representative of Greece to France, following the recommendation of Eynard. Later, he was appointed by Otto of Greece as Greek ambassador in France, Russian Empire, Sweden and Denmark. In 1839 he moved permanently in Athens and he served until 1840 as Member of the Council of the State while he was one of the first settlers of the old Athenian neighborhood Vathi or Vatheia.

King Otto I proposed him 3 times to be the Prime Minister of Greece, in 1836, 1837 and 1841, but he refused each time.

He died on 12 June 1864 in Athens. From his marriage to Roxani, he had three children, Gregorios Soutzos (famous painter of the time), Ioannis Soutzos and Maria Soutzou.

Preceded by Iakovos Argyropoulos	Grand Dragoman of the Porte; 1815–1818	Succeeded by John Callimachi
Preceded by Scarlat Callimachi	Prince of Moldavia; 1819–1821	Succeeded by Seneschals Manu and Rizo
