= Caradja =

Princely house of Byzantine and Phanariote Greek origins

Caradja Καρατζάς
- Coat of arms of the Caradja family
- Country: Byzantine Empire; Ottoman Empire; Romania; Greece
- Current region: Philippopolis; Dyrrhachium; Dalmatia; Danubian Principalities: Moldavia; Wallachia
- Origin: Constantinople, Byzantine Empire (now Istanbul, Turkey)
- Founded: 1091
- Founder: Argyros Karatzas
- Titles: Doux of Philippopolis; Doux of Dyrrhachium; Grand Postelnic of Moldavia; Prince of Wallachia
- Connected families: Rosetti family Kretzulescu family

The House of Caradja (also spelt as Karadja, Karaca, Caragea) or Karatzas (also spelt Caratzas; Greek: Καρατζάς) is a princely house of Byzantine and Phanariote Greek origins, present as dignitaries in the Ottoman Empire, and established as boyars and hospodars in the Danubian Principalities from the late 16th century.

== Origins ==
The princely House of Caradja originated in the Byzantine Empire, probably in the capital Constantinople. The earliest mentions of the family's history are present in historian Anna Komnene's Alexiad. In 1091, Emperor Alexios I Komnenos sent Argyros Karatzas to Dalmatia, and appointed him doux of Dyrrhachium and of Philippopolis in 1094. In the year 1453, during events surrounding the Fall of Constantinople, Eustathios Karadja was mentioned as the intermediary between Patriarch Gennadius II Scholarius and Sultan Mehmed II.

In 1591, a Constantin Caradja was assigned the rank of Grand Postelnic in Moldavia, and was therefore the first member of the family to be attested in one of the two principalities. Beginning with this generation, it is possible to reconstruct the family's genealogy completely. Constantin's nephew, the Postelnic Jean Karadja, was present in Wallachia, where he founded the monastery in Slobozia, as well as in Moldavia, where he restored the Saint Sava Church in Iași (1625).

== Branches ==
The two branches of the family descend from Constantin's other nephew, Constantin (Kostas) Caradja, who was himself Grand Postelnic of Moldavia in 1653. The descendants of his son Dumitrașco Caradja notably include Nicolae Caradja (1737–1784), reigning Prince of Wallachia in 1782–1783. The branch was extinguished in 1918, with the death of Prince Georges Caradja in Greece. The branch still in existence comprises the descendants of Dumitrașco's second son, George Caradja. His first son, the Grand Dragoman Scarlat (Charles) Caradja (1695–1780), was appointed Honorary Prince of Moldo-Wallachia by Sultan Abdul Hamid I, on September 26, 1774. Between 1761 and 1763, his brother Jean Caradja (c. 1700–1793), was the Patriarch of Constantinople, under the name of Joannicios III.

Scarlat's grandson, Ioan Gheorghe Caradja, was reigning Prince of Wallachia between 1812 and 1818, left two sons, the Beyzadés Georges and Constantin, from whom the present-day representatives of the family in Germany descend.

Beyzadé Georges Caradja married Smaragda Bibica, of the Rosetti family. Their grandson Prince Aristide Caradja (1861–1955) married Mathilde Grecianu (1862–1945), daughter of the univ. professor Alexandre Grecianu (1828–1894) from Iași. The couple had five children. The eldest, Prince Constantin Nicolas Caradja (1892–1961), who married Catherine Kretzulescu (1893–1993), a member of the Kretzulescu family; they had three children: Princess Irène Mathilde Catherine Caradja (1915–1940), who married Constantin Emandi (d. 1940); Princess Marie Constance Lucie Caradja (1916–1933); Princess Alexandra (Tanda) Caradja (1920–1997). Prince Aristide Caradja also had three daughters and a second son: Princess Marguerite Marie Catherine (1893–1933; married to Leon Sculy Logotheti), Princess Lucie Caradja (1894–1950; married to Carl Alfred Alioth), Princess Marcelle Hélène (1896–1971; married to Prince Constantin Jean Lars Anthony Démetre Karadja) and Prince Alexandre Caradja (1900–1930).

Beyzadé Constantin Caradja (1799–1860) and his wife Adèle Condo-Dandolo (1814–1890) had one son, Prince Jean Constantin Alexandre Othon Karadja Pasha (1835–1894), Ministre Plénipotentiaire, married with Mary-Louise Smith (1868–1943), daughter of commander L. O. Smith, Swedish Senator. The couple had two children: Prince Constantin Jean Lars Anthony Démetre Karadja (1889–1950), Consul General of Romania in Germany, married with Princess Marcelle Hélène Caradja, daughter of Prince Aristide Caradja, and Princess Despina Marie Roxane Alexandra Theodora Karadja (1892–1983) who had no descendants. The couple also had two children: Prince Jean (Ion) Aristide Caradja (1917–1993); married with Minna Frieda Auguste Starke (1911–1992) and in second marriage with Georgeta Cătănescu (1915–2017), and Princess Marie Marcelle Nadèje Karadja (1919–2006).

== Notable members ==
- Patriarch Joannicius III of Constantinople (c. 1700–1793) Archbishop of Peć and Serbian Patriarch from 1739 to 1746 and Ecumenical Patriarch of Constantinople from 1761 to 1763;
- Nicolae Caradja (1737–1784) – ruler of Wallachia (1782–1783);
- Ioan Gheorghe Caradja (1754–1844) – ruler of Wallachia (1812–1818);
- Ralou Caradja (1799–1870) – protector of arts and founder of the first theater in Bucharest called "Cișmeaua Roșie";
- Jean Karadja Pasha (1835–1894) – army officer, diplomat (father of Constantin);
- Aristide Caradja (1861–1955) – naturalist (entomologist), jurist, member of the Romanian Academy;
- Mary Karadja (1868–1943) – writer, spiritualist and wife of Jean Karadja Pasha
- Constantin Karadja (1889–1950) – diplomat, jurist, historian and bibliophile, honorific member of the Romanian Academy and Righteous Among the Nations;
- Catherine Caradja (born Ecaterina Olimpia Crețulescu, 1893–1993) – philanthropist and humanitarian worker.

== See also ==
- Caragea's plague
