= Lucie Lagerbielke =

Swedish author and painter (1865–1931)

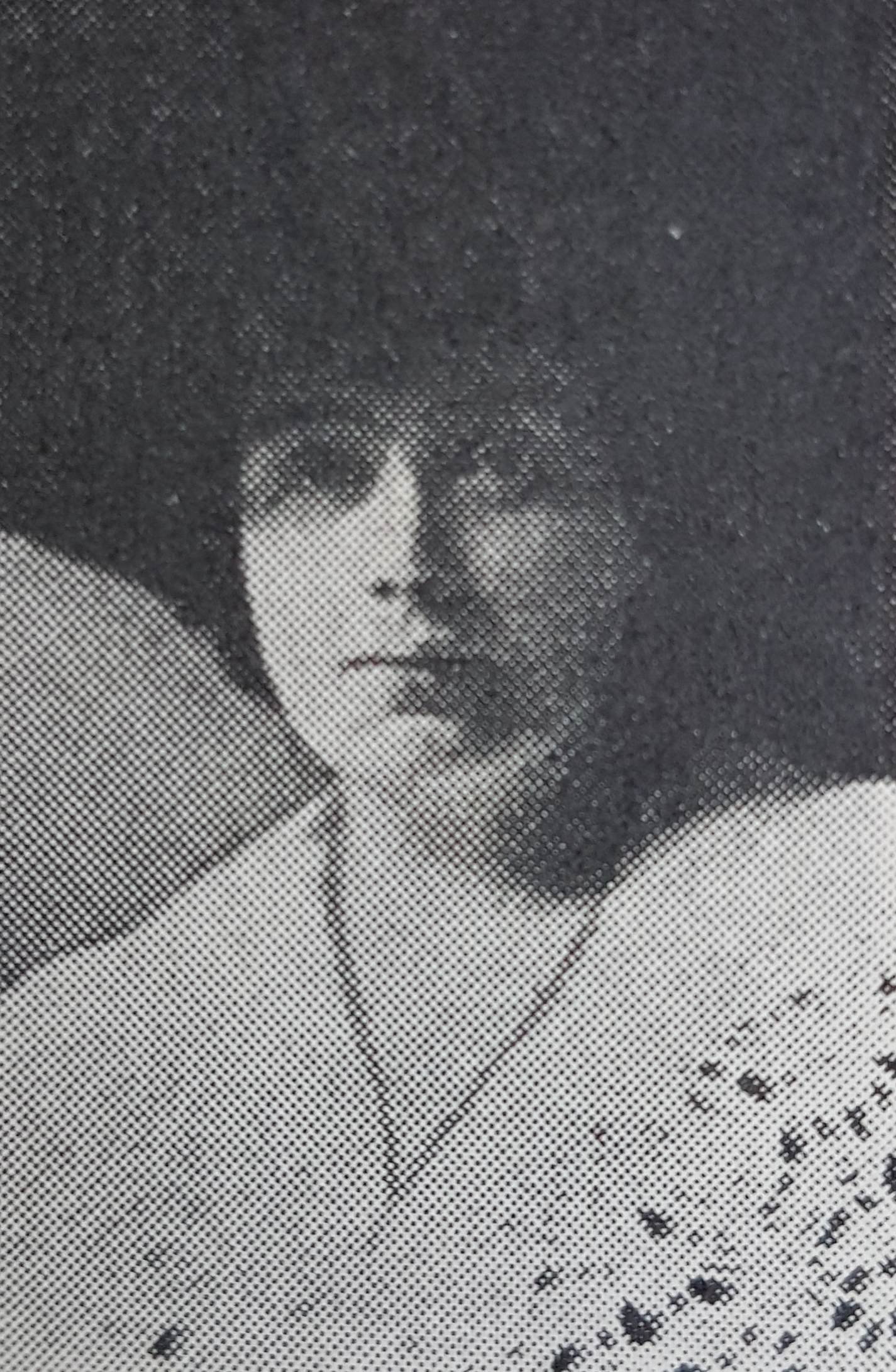
- Born: Lucie Smith; 13 April 1865; Stockholm, Sweden
- Died: 16 June 1931 (aged 66); Lidingö, Sweden
- Resting place: Norra begravningsplatsen
- Occupations: Writer; Painter
- Spouse: Henrik Lagerbielke (m. 1883; died 1906)
- Children: 2
- Relatives: Lars Olsson Smith (father); Mary Karadja (sister)

Lucie Lagerbielke (née Smith; 13 April 1865 – 16 June 1931) was a Swedish author, painter and baroness who was known for her works on Western esotericism.

== Early life and marriage ==
Lucie Smith was born on 13 April 1865 in Stockholm to Mary Louise Collin and wholesale merchant Lars Olsson Smith and was their third and second youngest child. Her mother was born as an illegitimate child to a fishwife but was later adopted by the royal Swedish court dentist. Meanwhile, her father was involved in the social reform movement and had made his fortune selling alcoholic beverages. Later in life he also served as a parliamentarian of the first chamber of the Swedish parliament.

At the age of 18, she became one of the richest women in Europe when she married naval captain Baron Henrik Lagerbielke. Together, they had two daughters. However, partly due to her socialist beliefs and strong anti-church and nobility views, she had a contentious relationship with her in-laws, who never fully accepted her into the family. Henrik Lagerbielke died in 1906, and afterward she distanced herself from his family.

== Spiritualism ==
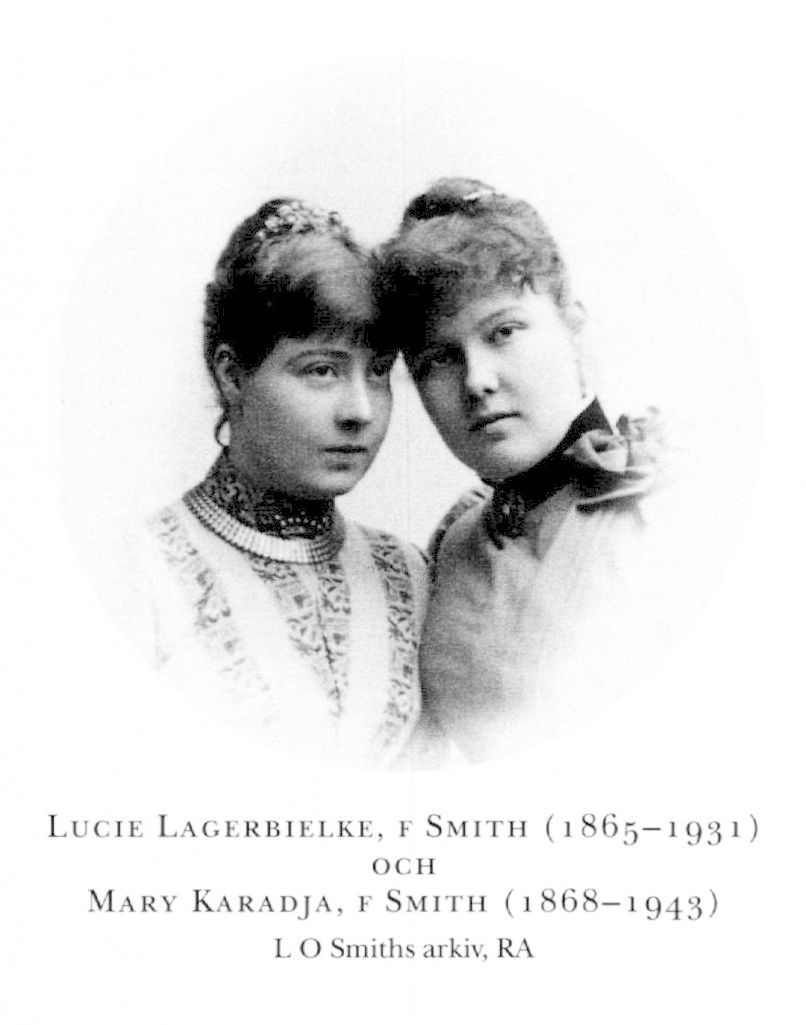
Lucie Lagerbielke (left) with her sister Mary Karadja (right) c. 1890

Both Lagerbielke and her younger sister Mary Karadja shared an interest in the occult and spiritualism, and both were rejected from joining the Edelweiss Society due to these interests. However, Lagerbielke disapproved of some aspects of spiritualism that her sister partook in, such as mediumship as she considered it unethical to attempt to make contact with the dead and to meddle with forces beyond their comprehension, and considered it spiritual rot. The sisters also disagreed politically; Karadja became involved with Nazism, while Lagerbielke was involved in socialism and Bolshevism.

In 1899, under the pseudonym Vitus she released the book Något om nervositet och naturkrafter: Om orsaker till en del nervös ora, hetta o.s.v., rumsångest, platsångest, och paralysi, samt hänvisningar till enkla – mångårigt pröfvade – skyddsmedel deremot [Essay on nervousness and natural forces: On the origins of some nervous unrests, heats, etc., ]. Her next book Lifvet och döden [Life and Death] was released in 1903, followed by Strid och frid [Conflict and Peace] in 1904. Both were published under the pseudonym Pax. She also frequently collaborated with Anna Maria Roos on books under the pseudonyms Carl Melcher, Tor Delling and Christina and Wilhelmina Terner. In 1911, Lagerbielke entered a public feud through the press with critic Poul Bjerre after he criticised her book Själens liv: en bok tillägnad de ensamma [The Life of the Soul: A Book for the Lonely], which lasted until 1912. From 1919 to 1922 and again from 1924 to 1925, she published the Framtidens Folk: tidning för andliga problem, psykisk forskning och social nydaning [People of the Future: Journal of Spiritual Problems, Psychic Research, and Social News] series, the majority of which she wrote herself.

Lagerbielke focused on psychic research with a scientific approach. She began to draw symbol-laden mediumistic artwork, which she claimed she drew under the influence of spirit guides. Her first few drawings were signed as Paula, a name she claimed she received from her spirit guide, Paul the Apostle, and was characterised by text, symbolism and allegorical occult elements, while her later works, published under the name Vitus, were more intense and freer in style.

== Death ==
In the last few years of her life, Lagerbielke suffered from ill health. She died on 16 June 1931 in Lidingö, at the age of 66. She was buried at Norra begravningsplatsen in Solna. Her grave monument depicts Lagerbielke naked and seated looking towards the skies, with engravings of the phrase ad astra (Latin for "towards the stars"), her name and her pseudonym (Förf Vitus, Swedish for "the writer Vitus").
