= Jean Karadja Pasha =

Ottoman general and diplomat (1835–1894)

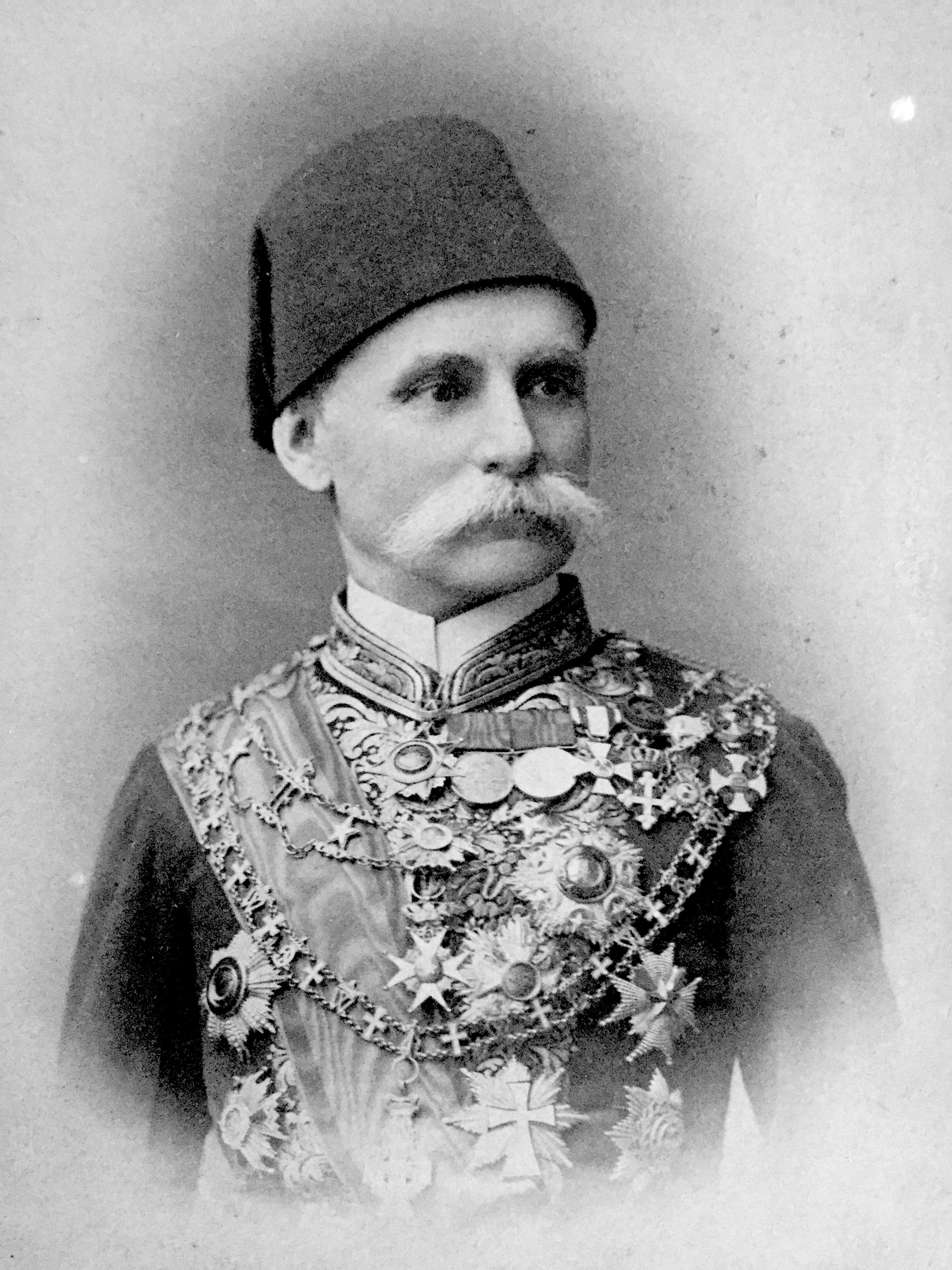
- Portrait, c. 1890

Ottoman Minister to the Netherlands
- In office 1881–1894
- Monarch: Abdul Hamid II
- Preceded by: Franz von Werner
- Succeeded by: Alexander Karatheodori

Ottoman Minister to Sweden
- In office 1881–1894
- Monarch: Abdul Hamid II
- Preceded by: Franz von Werner
- Succeeded by: Alexander Karatheodori

Personal details
- Born: 9 March 1835 Nauplia, Ottoman Empire
- Died: 11 August 1894 (aged 59) The Hague, Netherlands
- Spouses: Caroline Durand (m. 1859, divorced); Mary Smith (m. 1887)
- Children: Constantin
- Relatives: House of Karadja
- Awards: Order of Osmanieh; Order of the Medjidie; Order of the Polar Star

Military service
- Branch/service: Ottoman Army
- Years of service: 1854‍–‍1894

Prince Jean Constantin Alexandre Othon Karadja Pasha (March 9, 1835 in Nauplia – August 11, 1894 in The Hague) was a Phanariot army officer and diplomat of the Ottoman Empire. He was also a pianist and composer.

== Family ==
Jean was the son of Prince Constantin Caradja (1799–1860) and Adèle Condo Dandolo (1814–1891) who descended from the famous Venetian Dogal family. He was the grandson of Prince John G. Caradja, inheriting land in the Principality of Wallachia, which later became Romania.

In 1859 he married in Caroline Durand in Constantinople. They had one child before they divorced:

- Princesse Marguerite Karadja Caradja (1859–1944) who married a French diplomat, Baron Evain Pavée de Vendeuvre. They in turn had 7 children.

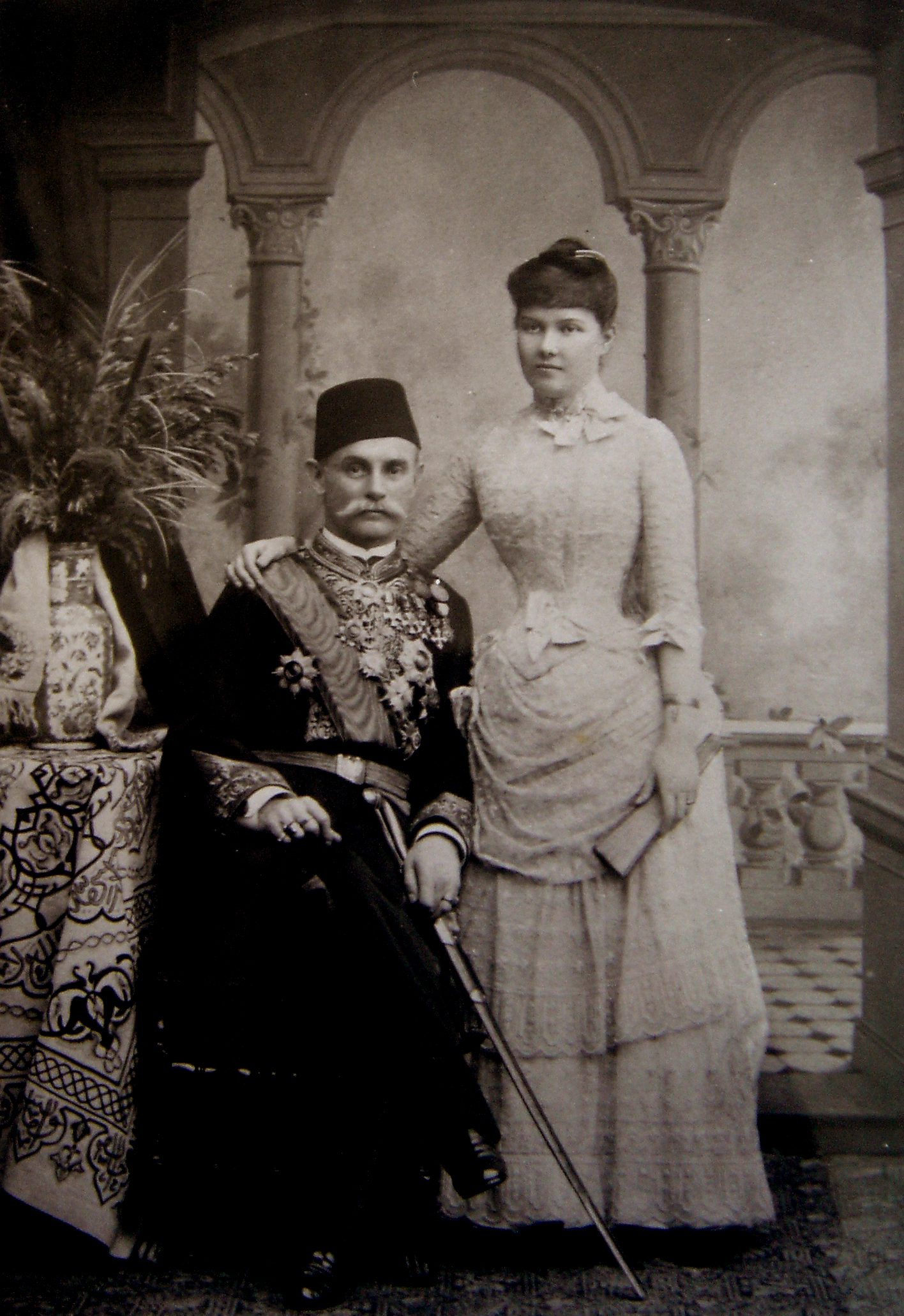
Karadja with his second wife Mary

On April 24, 1887 he married Marie Louise Smith, of Sweden, known as Princess Mary Karadja (1868–1943). She was the youngest daughter of Lars Olsson Smith. They had two children:

- Prince Constantin Karadja (1889–1950), who married Princess Marcelle Hélène Caradja (1896–1971).
- Princess Despina Marie Roxane Alexandra Theodora Karadja (1892–1983), Swedish poet and writer on mystical or spiritualist themes, with no marriage and without issue.

In 1887, his illegitimate daughter Jeanne Nyström (1885–1962), who was two years old, was adopted by Swedish banker Knut Agathon Wallenberg and his wife, and was re-named Nannie Wallenberg.

== Education and studies ==
After high school in Athens and the military school and law education in Berlin, he was admitted at age 15 to the translation office of the Ottoman Empire in 1850, through which all the future Ottoman diplomats passed.

== Diplomatic career ==
In 1851 Jean was appointed secretary of the Ottoman legation in Berlin, which was led by his father Constantin from December 1847 – October 1857. It was common practice that the lower officials of the Ottoman ministry were selected from their own family members. In 1854 he was appointed prime secretary of the Ottoman legation in The Hague and in November he was admitted to the Ottoman army as commander of the general staff. Keeping his title as prime secretary, he was named to the Ottoman legation in Brussels and in The Hague. He also takes office as military attaché.

In 1860 he was transferred to Turin and later as Consul General to Ancona. In April 1871 he was Consul General in Venice and in November 1874 in Brindisi. In September 1879 he was appointed director of the Imperial lyceum in Galatasaray and received the title Pasha. In July 1881 at the age of 46 and with 31 years in the diplomatic service, he was appointed Minister Plenipotentiary in The Hague and simultaneously in Stockholm where he became a well known personality in diplomatic circles and high society. He died in 1894 as minister for The Hague and Stockholm and was buried in the Orthodox chapel of the family castle in Bovigny, Belgium. From his 44 years in the Imperial Ottoman service, he lived only 2–3 years in Turkey.

== See also ==
- Caradja
