= Rallou Karatza =

Wallachian Greek aristocrat, theatrical manager and actress (1799–1870)

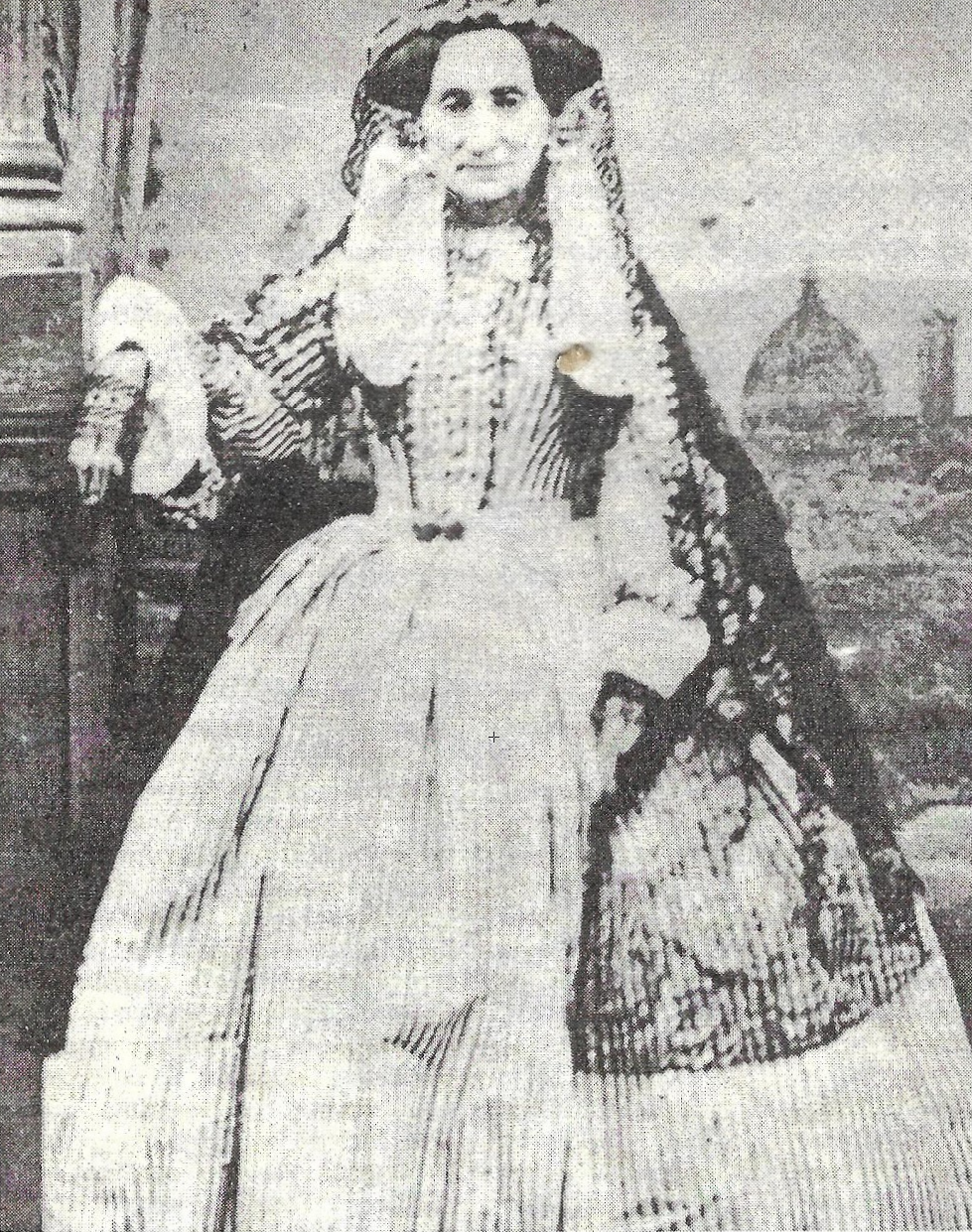
- Princess Rallou in her old age (black-and-white photograph of an unsigned portrait painting)

Consort to the Great Ban of Oltenia
- Reign: 1812 – June 1813
- Born: 1799; Istanbul, Ottoman Empire
- Died: 16 April 1870 (aged 70–71); Thonberg, Leipzig, Kingdom of Saxony
- Spouse: Georgios Argyropoulos
- Issue: Eleni, Baronness de Rouen; Emmanouil Argyropoulos
- House: Karatzas (Caradja)
- Father: John Caradja
- Mother: Eleni Skanavi
- Religion: Greek Orthodox
- Occupation: Translator, theatrical promoter, actress

Rallou Karatza-Argyropoulos (also rendered as Karatzis, Caradja and Karadja; Greek: Ραλλού Καρατζά Αργυροπούλου [raˈlu karaˈdza]; Romanian: Ralu Caragea Arghiropol [raˈlu karaˈdʒe̯a], commonly Domnița Ralu, "Lady Ralu"; Turkish: Ralu Karaca Argiropolis; 1799 – 16 April 1870) was a Phanariote Greek actress, theater director, and dramaturge, also noted as a participant in the Greek War of Independence. She was the second daughter of John Caradja, the Prince of Wallachia (reigned 1812–1818), and thus a prominent member of the Caradja family. She was also the wife of John's trusted courtier Georgios Argyropoulos, which also made her titular consort to the Great Banship of Oltenia in 1812–1813. While still a teenager, she was an arbiter of fashion and a promoter of Westernization, as well as, allegedly, a serial seducer. In 1816 or 1818, Rallou convinced her father to finance her artistic projects, and founded the first court theater, at Cișmeaua Roșie of Bucharest. This project, also involving figures such as Costache Aristia and Iordache Slătineanu, made her a participant in the Modern Greek Enlightenment, and supposedly the first Greek-language director. Her pivotal role in both Modern Greek and Romanian theater is widely acknowledged, clashing with the more controversial aspects of her youth—including her endorsement of her father's corruption and her own acts of despotism, such as a sartorial ban on the color white.

A subject of the Ottoman Empire, Rallou was won over by Greek nationalism, to the point of advocating emancipation from Ottoman rule. Her activity at the theater reflected her sympathy for, and possible initiation by, the Filiki Eteria. Her and her father's cultivation of the Eterists was abruptly ended in late 1818, when the threat of an Ottoman backlash forced the Caradjas out of Wallachia. They lived abroad in Restoration-era Switzerland, and later in the Grand Duchy of Tuscany; while in exile, Rallou networked with Philhellenes (including Mary Shelley), and supported Republican Greece. From 1830, she and other Caradajas resided in the newly proclaimed Greek state, and then in its successor kingdom, where Prince John died in 1844. To Wallachians, she remained an absentee landlady, quarreling with her tenants, nominally including all citizens of Ploiești.

Heading cultural clubs alongside her sister Roxani Soutzos and her friend Aristia, Princess Karatza penned Greek translations from Madame de Lambert and John Gillies. She followed her husband into the Kingdom of Saxony, dying there at the age of 70 or 71. She was by then consecrated as a literary character, in works by Panagiotis Soutsos and Nicolae Filimon. Romanian literature continued to focus on her life as a feminist precursor or a generally exotic figure, with her personality explored in novels by Bucura Dumbravă, Mateiu Caragiale, and Petru Manoliu. Episodes of her biography were also fictionalized in the 1970s with a children's play by Alexandru Mitru and two films by Dinu Cocea.

== Biography ==
=== Early life and Bucharest princess ===
Rallou was born in 1799 at Istanbul, capital of the Ottoman Empire, as the second of three daughters from John's marriage to Eleni Caradja; the latter was from a Phanariote banking family, the Skanavis. Historian Nicolae Iorga sees the Caradjas as having a distant "Asiatic origin", and traces the Skanavi lineage to Chios. The couple's first child was daughter Roxani or Roxandra, born in 1783, who married Michael Soutzos in 1812, while the youngest, Smaragda, married Spyridon Demetrios Mavrogenis; her two brothers were Georgios and Konstantinos (the latter was born "around 1799"). Through her father, Rallou was the great-granddaughter of John II Mavrocordatos, who served as Phanariote Prince of Moldavia in the 1740s. This lineage also made her a very distant descendant of a 15th-century Moldavian ruler, Stephen the Great. Around the time of Rallou's birth, John Caradja was emerging as a trusted diplomat of the Sublime Porte, visiting Wallachia to negotiate a settlement with the Habsburg monarchy, which ended the preceding war, and traveling as far as the Kingdom of Prussia. Rallou received a classical education, being especially versed in music and Greek literature. According to literary historian Ioan-Nicolae Popa, she could speak Greek, French, German and Ottoman Turkish; Lady Morgan, who met Rallou in March 1819, contrarily reports that she and her sisters had only mastered Greek.

Caradja first served as Grand Dragoman between 19 October and 18 November 1808, just as Sultan Mahmud II was consolidating power, returning for a second (and short) stint in 1812. Mahmud finally installed him on the Wallachian throne in August 1812. The new prince was despotic in his application of justice, and sometimes involved his daughter in the proceedings, placing her above the native boyardom. In February 1813, Frenchman Auguste de Lagarde noted that Caradja "[broke] his flail on a boyar of the court—a one-eyed man who stood accused of having insulted Princess Rallou". The young princess married Georgios (also known as Gheorghe or Iordache) Argyropoulos, who had served her father in various court offices. He was the country's Caimacam (Regent), between Cardja's investiture on 27 August 1812 and 22 October, the date of his actual ascent to power.

According to historian Paul Cernovodeanu, by May 1813 the couple were living in Craiova, with Argyropoulos serving as the Great Ban of Oltenia. This identification is based on a diary kept by British surgeon William Wittman, who visited the city and met its "Greek chief", as well as his "very beautiful" and scantly clad wife. Wittman describes the Ban (or Caimacam) as a cultured polyglot, noting that he was carrying out archeological digs around Caracal. Official Wallachian records for December 1812 have Argyropulous as a "former Great Ban" (bivvel ban) and Dumitrache Racoviță as a titular Caimacam of Oltenia. On 13 January 1813, Argyropoulos applied his Caimacam's seal, comprising the symbols of all Oltenian counties, to one of his resolutions. A successor, the non-Greek Radu Golescu, only took over in June of that year.

Theatrical historian Ioan Massoff reports rumors of Rallou's continued sexual promiscuity, and notes that she had given birth to several babies that she then abandoned in front of Bucharest churches, with her family's approval. In an 1822 letter, Prussian diplomat Ludwig Kreuchely von Schwerdtberg alleges that Prince Caradja "had a child by his own daughter, who is still alive" (de sa propre fille eut un enfant, qui vit encore); the claim is seen by Iorga as a calumny, possibly hinting at Rallou. Rallou was known to have covered up her father's spoils system, when, in February 1815, she bought Conțești village from Caradja loyalist Ioan Hagi Moscu, in exchange for 115 thousand thaler, only to sell it back in August for a much smaller sum. The princess had her own retinue, which included boyaress Sultana Gălășescu. According to a popular legend (partly validated by scholars M. Chopin and Abdolonyme Ubicini) Sultana used her influence at the court to rescue the hajduk Iancu Jianu from a death sentence, already pronounced by Prince John, by agreeing to marry him.

Seal used by Georgios Argyropoulos during his tenure as Great Ban of Oltenia (1813)

The princess was also personally involved in the work of Westernization that her father began to tolerate. She approved of local Prussians, who introduced her and others at the court to their lager, and who flew a hot air balloon from Dealul Spirii in June 1818. In contrast to accounts which date her first contribution to theater to 1812 (or even before), Hellenist Ariadna Camariano-Cioran argues that Princess Karatza only began her project in 1817, in a modest way—by improvising plays in her private quarters, to an audience of several boyars. According to scholar Walter Puchner, the accounts actually refer to Rallou's work with the "Greek amateur stage at the 'Authentic Academy'" (namely, the Princely Academy of Bucharest, whose trustees included her husband the Ban). That group had begun to stage adaptations of Homer during 1816, with the princess taking over as director in spring–autumn 1817. She organized a new troupe, whose star pupils included Costache Aristia; it moved to a new stage at the princely complex, and had a repertoire comprising adaptions from Euripides, Longus, Sophocles, as well as Vittorio Alfieri and Voltaire.

=== Cișmeaua Roșie ===
Massoff proposes that Rallou was spurred on developments in French theater, and specifically the Comédie-Française; she may also have been familiarized with the status of theatrical life in the Austrian Empire, through her friendly contacts with Friedrich von Gentz (personal secretary of the Austrian Chancellor, Klemens von Metternich). Prince John reportedly appeared to give personal encouragement, being present for at least one play in which his daughter performed, "disguised as a tragic Muse." Historian Yiannis Sideris views her as the first-ever director in the history of Modern Greek theater; she also contributed directly on the Greek translation of the plays. According to various reports, Rallou also organized musical parties, which included what may have been the first renditions of Ludwig van Beethoven in Wallachia (played on Bucharest's only piano). The account, rendered in unclear sources, may be read as an indication that Rallou herself played the Appassionata. This is placed in doubt by scholar George D. Florescu, who argues that, though a "good musician", Rallou would have been incapable of such a major feat. He proposes that the performer was a foreign guest of hers, whose name remains unrecorded.

The autonomous institution finally established by Rallou at Cișmeaua Roșie on Podul Mogoșoaiei (December 1817) is described by Popa as "the first professional (Greek-language) theatrical troupe in the Romanian lands." Camariano-Cioran questions such assessments, noting that Rallou actually worked with "Gerger" or "Gherghy", a German-speaking troupe from the Principality of Transylvania, which put up a version of L'italiana in Algeri (by Gioachino Rossini) on 8 September 1818. Enthusiastic at first, Wallachians stopped attending the shows when they found that the language barrier was impassible. The story of these early theatrical years remains mysterious to a degree: "the information from primary sources and the bibliography are contradictory." Examples of unreliable accounts include the claim that Rallou had sent Aristia to study with François-Joseph Talma in Paris, for which, as Puchner notes, "no evidence" exists.

Several historians have placed Rallou's primacy as a Wallachian theatrical producer under some doubt. Anca Hațiegan, relying on an earlier text by Massoff, suggests that a theater had already been functioning in Bucharest in 1783–1784. Constantin Gane mentions a Franco–Italian troupe performing in Bucharest in 1798, though he argues that most shows of the period were street performances. He concludes that, before Rallou, "the people of Bucharest had no idea what theater was all about." M. Valsa argues that Konstantinos Iatropoulos had set up a Greek theater in Bucharest as early as 1810; his account is disputed by Camariano-Cioran, who believes that Valsa misread documents referring to 1820, and therefore to activities which took place after Rallou. Another challenge to Rallou's claim was brought up by her grandnephew, Constantin Karadja, who notes that, during a Russian occupation of Bucharest in the earliest 1810s, Mikhail Kutuzov had been a patron of Italian and Polish companies relocated to Wallachia. Popa suggests that Rallou's own efforts may have been backed by a Wallachian boyar, Iordache Slătineanu, who had already published Romanian translations from Western dramatists.

Already in 1817, Cișmeaua was a testing ground for Greek nationalism in general, and the Filiki Eteria society in particular; though he refrained from openly cultivating the Eterists, Prince John allowed his son Konstantinos, and his nephew Alexandros Mavrokordatos, to join their ranks. Cultural historian Elisavet Papalexopoulou notes that there is no definitive way to prove that Rallou was ever initiated into the Eteria, though, like her sister Roxani, she "operated under the influence of the society, supported its revolutionary aims, and knew about its existence." According to Massoff, Rallou also had conservative tastes: she was partly responsible for introducing a taboo on the color white, which was now reserved for the princely family; Massoff believes that the fixation reflection the usage of white as a monarchist color in the restored Kingdom of France. The ban was ignored by the boyaress Tarsița Filipescu, who was publicly humiliated by Prince John for her insubordination.

The cultivation of Eterist youths could only last for a few months: Rallou left Wallachia hastily, with her entire family, in autumn 1818; this was "in order to avoid the fate of many other Phanariot[e]s who had sat on the throne of the Transdanubian Principalities, who had been decapitated or hanged." A servant of the prince, Alexandru Brătășanu, kept a note of the exact date at which Rallou and her husband left Bucharest, as being the morning of 29 September (New Style: 11 October). His note suggests that the Prince and his progeny left together with the other courtiers and family members, including Mavrokordatos, Constantin Vlahutzi, and Aga Vlangăru; a woman named Sofiița (or Sofiica) was used as a scout. Chopin and Ubicini recount that the former Great Ban and his wife arranged for Prince Caradja to meet them in Băneasa, before joining him on his trek to Austrian Transylvania.

Papalexopoulou notes that, due to her hurried escape from the country, Rallou never actually had a chance to appear on stage at Cișmeaua Roșie. Cișmeaua continued to host theatrical events after her departure: in 1819, a theatrical committee was set up, introducing a program of Greek-language plays. One of the local productions was Jean Racine's Phèdre, in a mixture of French and Greek. It featured Marghioala Bogdăneasca, the first ethnic Romanian stage actress; she appeared alongside a woman simply known as Elena, whose background is unrecorded. Several members of the Karatzas company, including the known Eterist Aristia, were able to continue performing there. A French visitor, F. G. Laurençon, noted that, by late 1820, the otherwise "fickle" boyars had acquired an unusually stable taste for theatrical performances. An Italian troupe visited the location, but was chased away by the start of an anti-Phanariote uprising in 1821. The Cișmeaua location was finally destroyed in a fire during 1825 of early 1826. Meanwhile, Rallou's involvement in musical life was continued by her niece and singing pupil, Esmeralda Argyropoulos-Ghica.

=== Independence War and later life ===
After passing through Transylvania, the Kingdom of Hungary, and finally Austria-proper, the Caradjas, "accompanied by a sizable clientele", set for Geneva, in the restored Swiss Confederation. During their prolonged stay here, they frequented botanist Augustin Pyramus de Candolle. The latter recalled in 1862 that Rallou and her sisters, though stylish, were unable to carry a conversation (as noted by historian Andrei Pippidi, such claims are to be seen as doubtful). After a six-month stay in Switzerland, the Caradjas relocated to the Grand Duchy of Tuscany, with Rallou dividing her time between Pisa and Florence. The Prince was under the direct protection of Tuscan authorities, with censors intervening to remove any criticism of him in the local papers. At Pisa, Rallou entered a political correspondence with Tzanny Koutoumas, her father's agent in Paris. She had a young daughter, Eleni. Around 1819, she commissioned a portrait of her father, which copied an earlier work from the 1790s but added Eleni in his lap. Also in 1819, she translated Madame de Lambert's Avis d'une mère à sa fille, as Παραινέσεις μητρός προς θυγατέρα. She is known to have penned a Greek translation of the History of Ancient Greece, by John Gillies.

The family became involved in the Greek War of Independence, with the former Prince providing funds for nationalists and Philhellenes, notably by sending regular gifts to fighters such as Georgios Karaiskakis, Apostolis Kolokotronis, and Andreas Miaoulis. His eldest son Konstantinos was briefly an active participant on the Aetolian theater of war. John's home in Pisa welcomed supporters of the Greek cause, including Lord Byron and Percy Bysshe Shelley. By September 1822, Rallou had been acquainted with this group, and was corresponding with Mary Shelley, sending her condolences on Percy's death (while also reporting that she was reading from William Godwin). Shelley named a character in The Last Man "Argyropolo", possibly as a tribute to her Pisan acquaintances.

In the midst of war, Phanariote Panagiotis Soutsos, who had met and secretly loved Rallou as a youth, was partly inspired by her story in writing Ο Οδοιπόρος ("The Wanderer")—seen by Puchner as one of the first-ever Greek contributions to Romantic literature. The princess relocated into the new Hellenic State in 1830, at roughly the same time as her father. Her friend Hagi Moscu, who was liquidating his father's debtors in Wallachia, borrowed 1,000 thaler from her, and was paying her a monthly interest of 50 thaler by 1828. She also continued to draw revenue as a Wallachian landowner, obtaining from her brother Konstantinos the city of Ploiești, as a nominal fief. In a letter she addressed to the Boyars' Divan in 1829, she noted that opposition and sabotage by her tenants had made it impossible for her to collect income from that area.

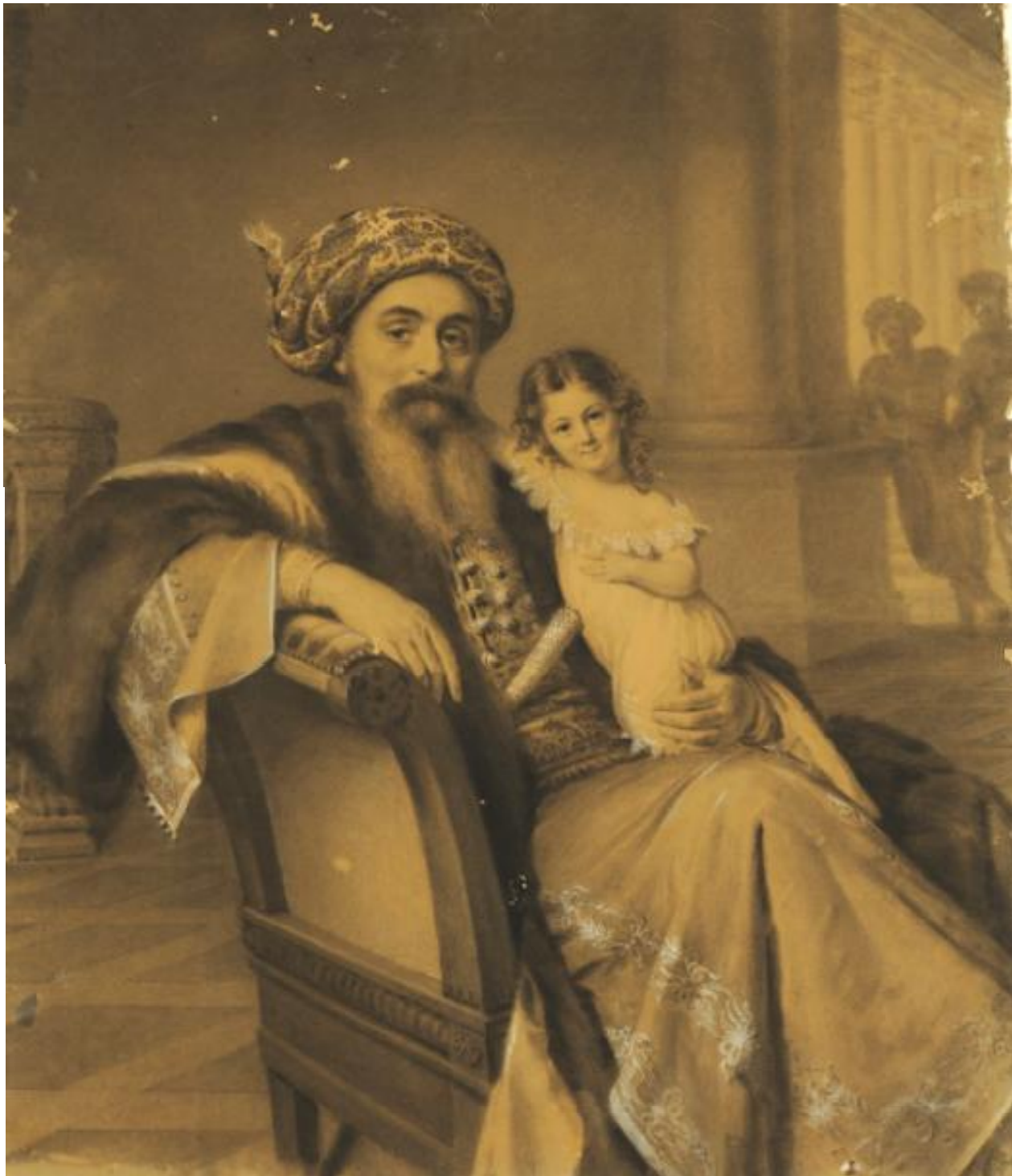
John Caradja and granddaughter Eleni Argyropoulos, in the portrait dedicated to them by Rallou

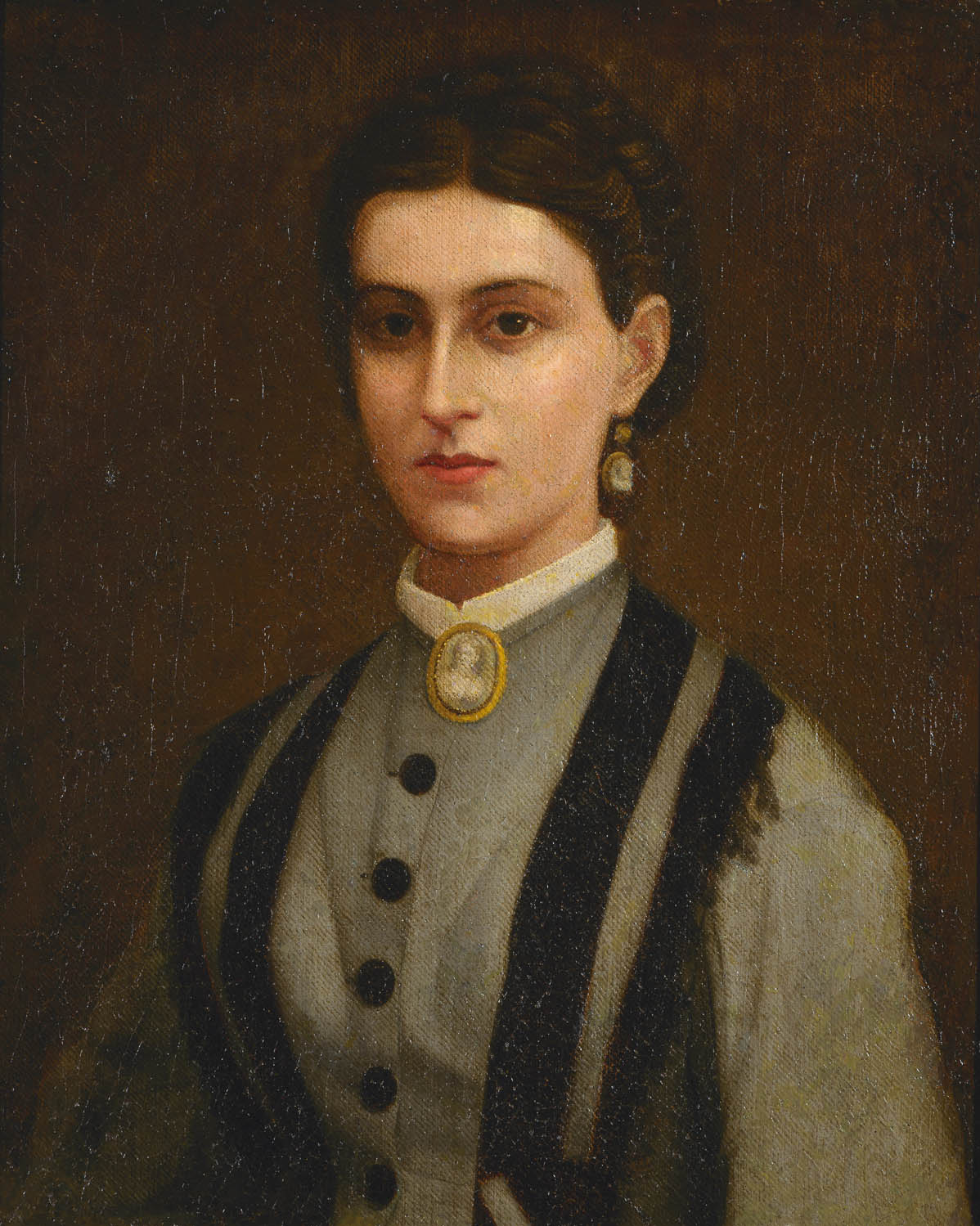
Rallou's niece, Rallou Karatza-Kolokotronis, by Georgios Margaritis

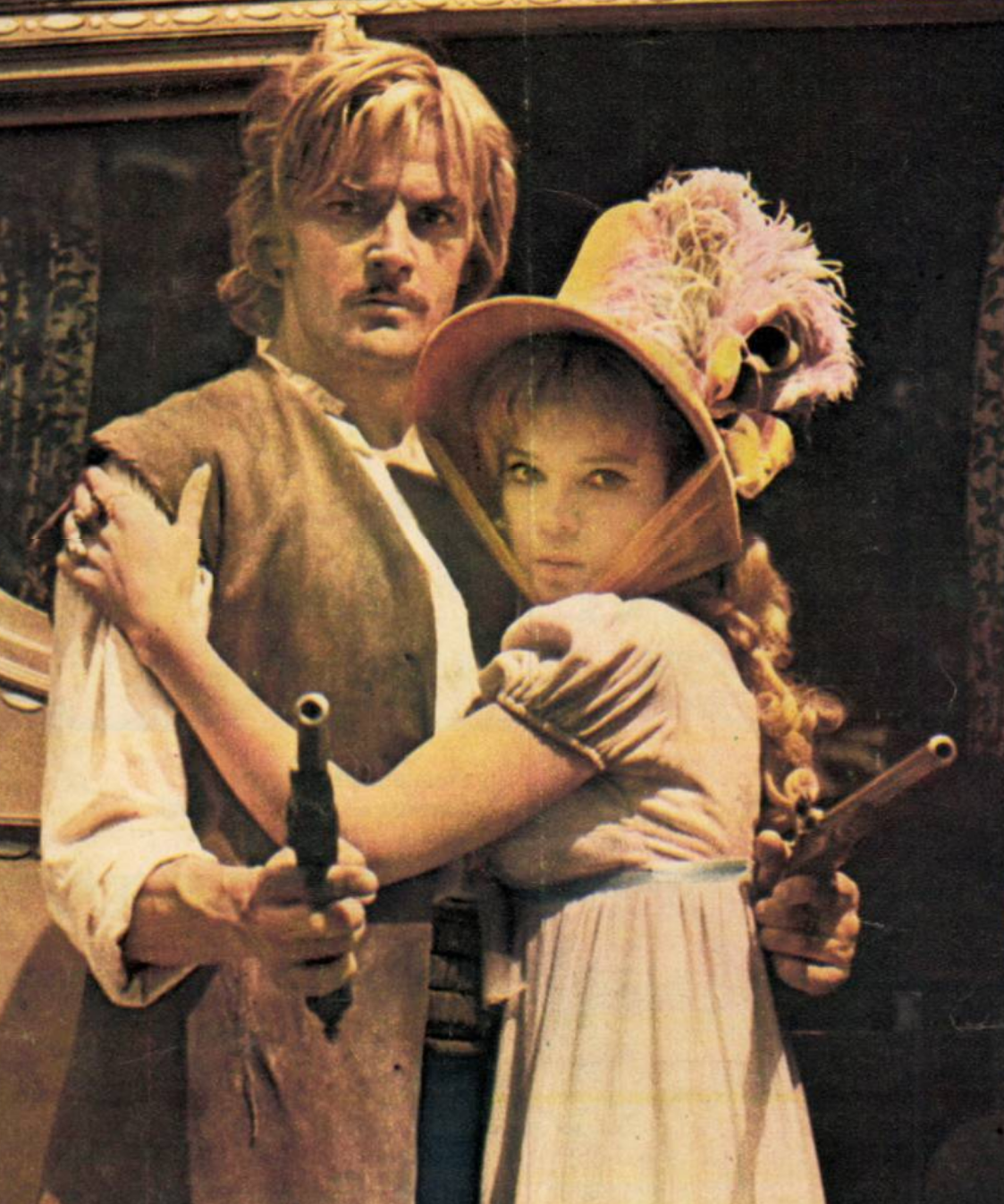
Aimée Iacobescu as Princess Rallou, hugging Florin Piersic during filming for Haiducii lui Șaptecai (photograph by A. Mihailopol)

Both Rallou and her sister Roxani made their homes into "philological salons", pioneering women's education in Greece. In the early 1840s, as that country evolved into a Kingdom of Greece, Prince John helped his daughter's friend Aristia set up the Philodramatic Society of Athens. John died at Athens on 27 December 1844. According to a report by A. Bouchon, the Phanariotes were still disliked by the egalitarian Athenians, prompting Rallou to marry a commoner, Konstantinos Kolokotronis; this information conflated two Rallous: Karatza-Argyropoulos and her niece (her brother Georgios' daughter).

In their late years, the elder Rallou and Georgios Argyropoulos moved to Thonberg, near Leipzig, in the Kingdom of Saxony, leaving their estate in Athens to be tended by John's other descendants. Rallou died in that town on 16 April 1870, some two years after Princess Roxani. She was survived by her two children: Eleni, who had married the Baron de Rouen, and a son, Greek diplomat Emmanouil Argyropoulos (husband of Pulheria Cantacuzino-Pașcanu). As argued by heraldist Tudor-Radu Tiron, her Argyropoulos marriage may account for the usage of Caradja arms by other Argyropoulos branches, even those not directly descending from her.

== Legacy ==
A 1972 footnote by cultural historian Alexandru Duțu sees Princess Karadza as having played a part in women's emancipation in Romania, alongside Catherine Soutzos and Roxana Samurcaș—though, as he adds, their stances were largely confined to a "transformation of mores" among the boyars, and overall ignored by the masses. During her lifetime, Rallou was occasionally reviled, along with her father, by Romanian nationalists—including her contemporary chronicler, Ioan Dobrescu, who had embraced strong Hellenophobia and detested Caradja for his "savage spoliation of the peasantry". Dobrescu recorded in writing his joy at witnessing the fire which consumed Cișmeaua. In his view, the Princess, whom he mistakenly identified as "Raru" or "Raro", had driven boyars away from contemplative Christianity. The building, Dobrescu contended, was capiștea dumnezeilor elinești ("the temple of Greek gods"), and therefore a proxy for devil-worship. The ruins of the building were still visible into the 1880s, and marked one portion of Fântânei Street.

Rallou was celebrated by the intellectual circles of Wallachia and the post-Wallachian Kingdom of Romania, though some details of her life remained obscure. Writing in 1937, Massoff contended that "the beautiful Greek lady has avenged her many sins" with her cultural activity, which he views as a sample of "creative snobbery". Massoff also noted that was unaware of what happened to the princess after her departure from Bucharest: "Did she grow old in Pisa, where Caradja had taken his retirement, or did she die young?" Rallou is a background character in Nicolae Filimon's 1862 novel, Ciocoii vechi și noi ("Upstarts Old and New"), which is primarily noted for its sympathetic depiction of her father. Her memory is preserved in historical fiction through several other works, including a 1903 German-language novel by Bucura Dumbravă—showing her and Sultana Gălășescu as "admirable types of ideal women". In early 1916, feminist Adela Xenopol of Iași was running a private theater company known as Domnița Caragea ("Princess Caragea", after she who "has established and built Bucharest's first theater"). It produced plays by female authors, including Xenopol herself. The princess' status as a feminist icon was also reaffirmed by activist Maria C. Buțureanu, who included a profile of Karatza in her own Femeia. Studiu social ("Woman. A Social Study"), printed in 1921.

Rallou is used as a plot device in Craii de Curtea-Veche, Mateiu Caragiale's groundbreaking novel of 1929: Pașadia, the Phanariote protagonist, boasts his descent from a fictional lover of the princess, whose sexual favors she rewarded with a boyar's rank. The story is a mix of elements from the factual biography of Caroline of Brunswick and those of Caragiale's own Phanariote ancestors. A romanticized biography of Rallou, criticized for its unevenness, was penned and published in 1939 by Petru Manoliu. A Iancu Jianu ballet, created by Oleg Danovski in 1964, had Cora Benador as the princess. John Caradja's reign is also depicted the Dinu Cocea's adventure-comedy films, Haiducii lui Șaptecai and Zestrea domniței Ralu (both released in 1971), which have Aimée Iacobescu as the female lead—a fictionalized Rallou. These were followed in 1973 by Iancu Jianu, a children's play co-written by Alexandru Mitru and Aurel Tita, which had ample depictions of Caradja and his court; Daniela Anencov was selected to play Rallou.
