= Marigo Alkaiou =

Greek stage actor

Marigo Alkaiou (Greek: Μαριγώ Αλκαίου; c. 1790 – 1865) was a Greek actress. She belonged to the pioneers of the modern Greek theater of the 19th century.

She was born on Lesbos, and accompanied her husband Theodoros Alkaios to Bucharest.

She belonged to the actors of the Greek amateur theatre society of Rallou Karatza who staged plays in Bucharest from 1818 onward, which simultaneously made her the first actress in Romania as well as the first Greek actress, although she was an amateur rather than a professional stage artist. She was the most prominent actress in this troupe and often played the main female roles.

She returned to Greece after the independence of 1830 and settled in Syros. Theatre was very popular in Greece after independence, and she performed in the amateur theatre of her spouse. While the theatre was not professional, it was considered very controversial for a woman to perform on stage, and she was possibly the first Greek woman to have done so in Greece. Because of her importance as an actress, she was called "The Younger Sappho".
