= Haiducii lui Șaptecai =

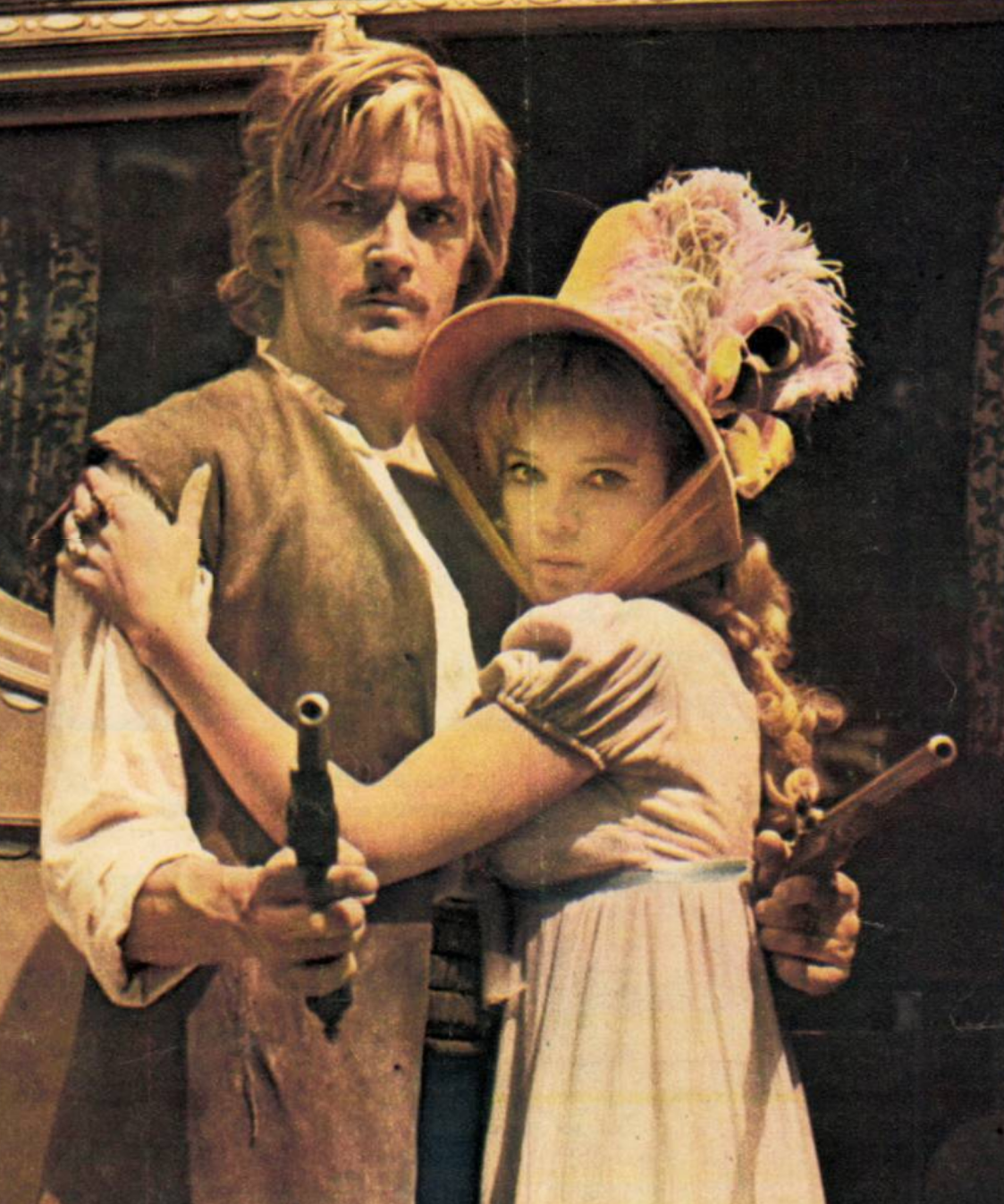
- Aimée Iacobescu as Rallou Karatza, hugging Florin Piersic during filming for Haiducii lui Șaptecai
- Directed by: Dinu Cocea
- Starring: Florin Piersic; Marga Barbu; Colea Rautu
- Release date: 1971
- Country: Romania
- Language: Romanian

Haiducii lui Șaptecai is a 1971 Romanian film directed by Dinu Cocea.

== Cast ==
- Florin Piersic – Anghel Șaptecai (voiced by Petre Gheorghiu-Dolj)
- Marga Barbu – Anita
- Colea Rautu – Mamulos
- Toma Caragiu – Răspopitul
- Florin Scărlătescu – Dudescu
- Aimée Iacobescu – Ralu
- Nucu Păunescu – Phanariote (John Caradja)
- Constantin Codrescu – Iani
- Nicolae Gărdescu – Manolache Belivacă
- Constantin Guriță – Duduveică
- Ileana Buhoci-Gurgulescu – Fira (as Ileana Buhoci Gurgulescu)
- Jean Constantin – Parpanghel
- Mariella Petrescu – Sevastița
- Carmen Maria Strujac – Caliopi (as Carmen Maria Struja)
- Theo Partisch
- Rudolf Chati
- Constantin Lungeanu
- Aurel Rogalschi – Sultan's envoy
- Ștefan Tapalagă
- Aurel Cioranu – Raul
- Mihai Mereuță – Găman
- Dorel Iacobescu
- Manea Enache
- Vasile Boghiță
- Mihai Badiu
- Petre Gheorghiu-Dolj (as Petre Gheorghiu)
- Mircea Pascu
- Lucian Purdea
