= Aimée Iacobescu =

Romanian actress (1946–2018)

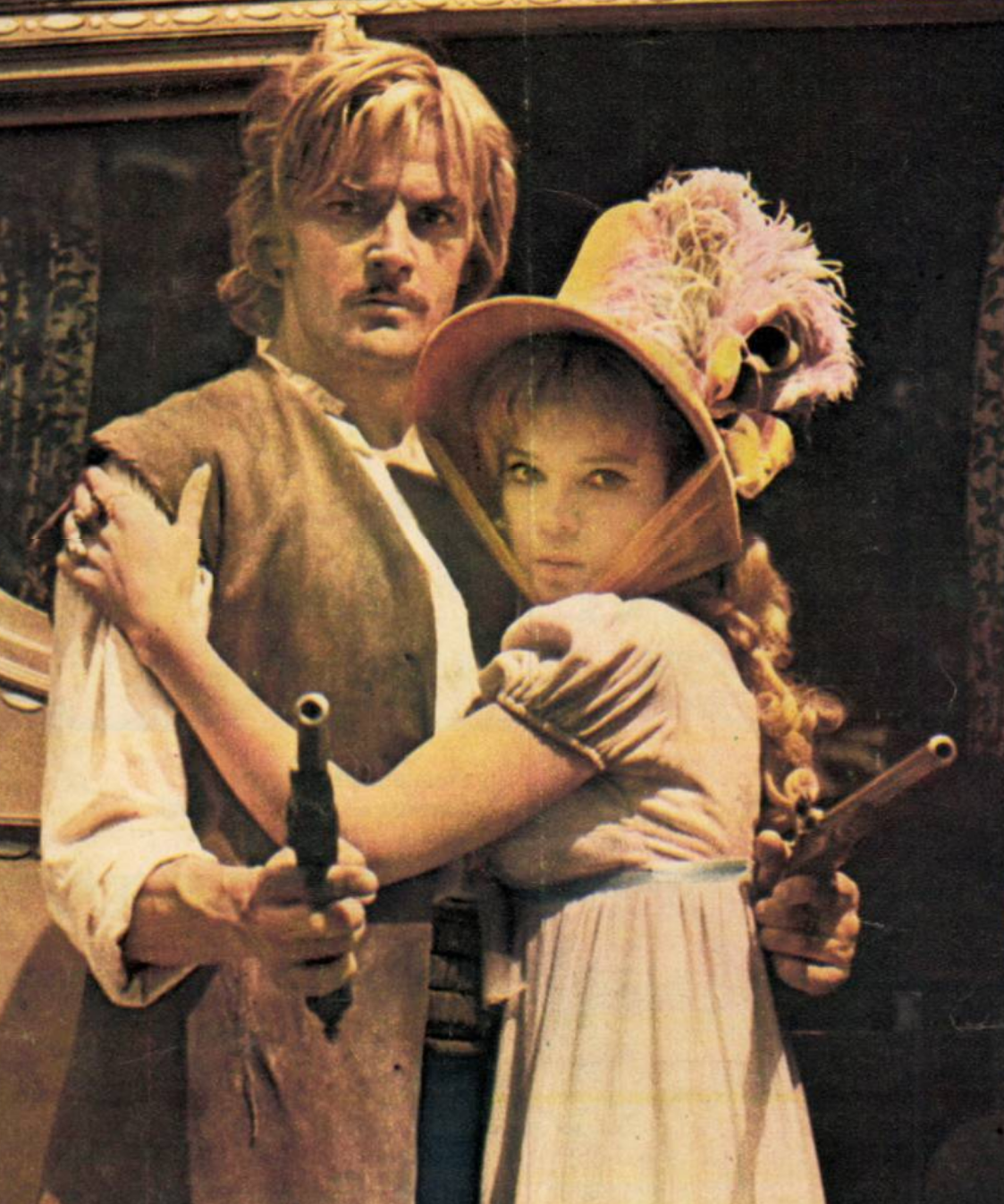
- Iacobescu as Rallou Karatza, hugging Florin Piersic during filming for Haiducii lui Șaptecai (1970)
- Born: 1 June 1946; Unguriu, Buzău County, Romania
- Died: 27 March 2018 (aged 71); Bucharest, Romania
- Occupation: Actress
- Years active: 1967–2009

Aimée Iacobescu (1 June 1946 – 27 March 2018) was a Romanian actress. She appeared in seventeen films and television shows between 1967 and 2009.

== Selected filmography ==
- Sept hommes et une garce (1967)
- Haiducii lui Șaptecai (1971) - Domnița Ralu
- Cu mâinile curate (1972)
- The Doom (1976)
- State de România - Student la Sorbona (2009) - Brigitte
