= Ottomar Rodolphe Vlad Dracula Prince Kretzulesco =

Ottomar Rodolphe Vlad Dracula Prinz Kretzulesco (born Ottomar Berbig; 10 October 1940 – 17 November 2007) was a flamboyant German socialite who achieved fame through a claim of adopted lineage from Vlad Dracula, the inspiration for Count Dracula.

== Biography ==
Ottomar Berbig was an antiques dealer in West Berlin in 1978 when an elderly woman entered his store wanting to sell heirlooms. The woman was Romanian princess Catherine Caradja (also known as Princess Caradja-Kretzulesco), who claimed to be a blood relative of Vlad Dracula. The two became friends, and the princess was keen to adopt Berbig as her family had no male heirs to carry the family name.

Once formally adopted, the newly renamed "Prince Kretzulesco" proved adroit at exploiting his 'Dracula lineage'. From his 46-room palace located in the town of Schenkendorf (Brandenburg), he organized so-called "blood-sucking parties" in conjunction with the German Red Cross at which guests were invited to donate blood. Likewise he entertained numerous other charity events including medieval festivals and ghost story-telling evenings. He also set up a wine business, marketing under the Castle of Dracula label, and became a local councillor, at one time proclaiming the town of Schenkendorf 'Dracula's Principality'.

Kretzulesco died in Königs Wusterhausen of a brain tumor on 17 November 2007, aged 67. He was survived by his wife, Janett, and their 11 month-old son (and heir), Ottomar Dracula Junior.
