= Catherine Caradja =

Romanian princess (1893–1993)

- Born: Ecaterina Olimpia Crețulescu; 28 January 1893; Bucharest, Romania
- Died: 26 May 1993 (aged 100); Bucharest, Romania
- Occupations: aristocracy philanthropy
- Awards: Virtus et Fraternitas Medal

Princess Catherine Olympia Caradja (born Ecaterina Olimpia Crețulescu; 28 January 1893 – 26 May 1993) was a Romanian aristocrat and philanthropist. Born in Bucharest, she grew up in England and France, and lived in Romania from 1908 to 1952, when she escaped from the communist regime on a Danube boat. An expatriate in the United States for 35 years, and a longtime resident of the Hill Country of Texas, she returned after the Romanian Revolution of 1989 to Bucharest, where she died a centenarian.

== Humanitarian - Honours ==
Princess Caradja is known for her humanitarian work in the interbellum, and especially for her efforts to ease the burden of captivity for over a thousand American and British airmen, taken prisoner during the bombing of Romania in World War II. She cared for them on her property and in the hospitals she ran; those activities earned her the nickname "Angel of Ploiești" among the crews. In 1977, she was awarded the George Washington Honor Medal by the Freedoms Foundation at Valley Forge.

== Early years ==
She was born in Bucharest, the daughter of Romanian nobleman Radu Crețulescu and his wife, Princess Irina Cantacuzino. Caught in a financial struggle between her parents' families, she was abducted at the age of three by her father, who took her to England, and placed her in an orphanage under an assumed name. Her mother (who divorced her father, and remarried to Prince Nicolae Ghica) kept looking for her, but died in 1906. The princess was accidentally found in 1908 in a French convent by an aunt, who helped her escape, and brought her back to Romania, where the courts put her in custody of the Cantacuzino family. She was raised by her maternal grandmother and her maternal grandfather, Prince Gheorghe Grigore Cantacuzino, the Prime Minister of Romania at the turn of the 20th century.

The princess was educated in England, France, Romania, and Belgium, and spoke five languages. In 1914, just before the start of World War I, she married Prince Constantin Caradja (1892–1962), a member of an old and influential House of Caradja. After German troops entered Romania in 1916 (see Romanian Campaign (World War I)), she fled from Bucharest with her two daughters, Irène Mathilde Catherine (born the year before) and Marie Constance Lucie (born ten days before). After taking refuge in Moldavia, she started working as a volunteer in a 30-bed hospital for typhus patients (she contracted the disease herself).

After the Armistice, Princess Caradja went back to Bucharest, and devoted herself to social work, most notably, at Saint Catherine's Crib, a complex of orphanages started by her mother, which housed more than 3,000 children.

In 1920, she gave birth to a third daughter, Alexandra (1920–1997). The second daughter died in Vienna in 1933, while her eldest daughter and her husband (Constantin Emandi) were killed in the deadly earthquake of 10 November 1940.

== World War II and aftermath ==
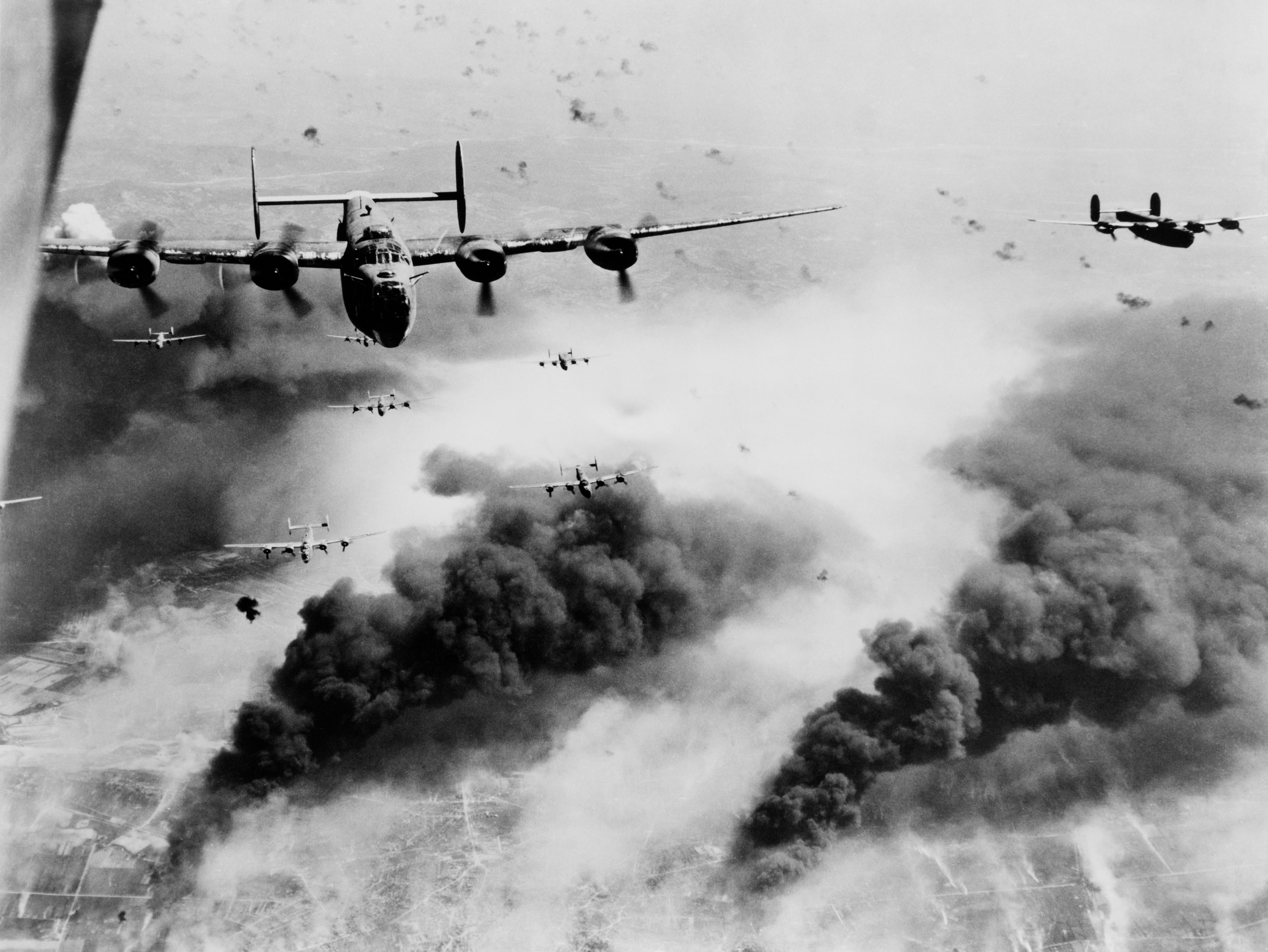
B-24s from the 15th Air Force bomb Ploiești oil fields.

The princess first became known internationally as a result of her opposition to Romania's alliance with Nazi Germany during the Second World War (see Romania during World War II). When the oilfields at Ploiești were bombed by the Allies in August 1943 in Operation Tidal Wave, she personally took custody of surviving Allied crews, saw that they were cared for in her hospitals, and facilitated their escape to Italy. During the Allied bombings of spring and summer 1944, several American airmen landed on her estate at Nedelea, after either emergency landing or parachuting. Throughout the war, she eased the burden of captivity for more than one thousand flyers who had been shot down. Those deeds earned her the nickname "Angel of Ploiești" among the airmen. One of the pilots who survived crash landing, and escaped thanks to her efforts, was Richard W. Britt, who recounted the story in a book, many years later.. She also features in Adam Makos’ book, Tidal Wave.

After the Communist regime was established in Romania, her orphanages and foundation were nationalized in 1949. Her daughter, who had left for Paris in 1948, helped the princess escape in early 1952, with assistance from the French secret services; she left the country on a Danube tanker, arriving after 8 weeks in Vienna. During the winter of 1954–55, the princess directed relief efforts for children in Algiers, in the wake of the September 9, 1954 earthquake. She traveled widely, giving talks in France on "Life Behind the Iron Curtain", and speaking at the BBC.

== In America ==
In December 1955, Caradja received a visa to come to the United States; soon after landing, she appeared on the Dave Garroway show. She resided in the U.S. for more than 35 years, mainly in the town of Comfort (in the Hill Country of Texas), but also in Baltimore, Maryland and in Kansas City. While traveling across America, speaking at various venues, she found more than five hundred of the former prisoners of war she knew from Romania. She organized a reunion in Dallas, Texas on 28 August 1972, an event that continued to be held each year for many years, with the Princess as the guest of honor and main speaker.

On 27 August 1976, during the U.S. bicentennial year, she helped present a Peace Monument for the Freedoms Foundation at the Valley Forge National Historical Park; in January 1977 she was awarded the George Washington Honor Medal by the Foundation.

In 1978 she befriended Ottomar Berbig, an antiques dealer in West Berlin. The princess was keen to adopt Berbig, as her family had no male heirs to carry the family name. Berbig took the name of Ottomar Rodolphe Vlad Dracula Prince Kretzulesco, and the adoption was formalized in 1990.

== Return to Romania ==
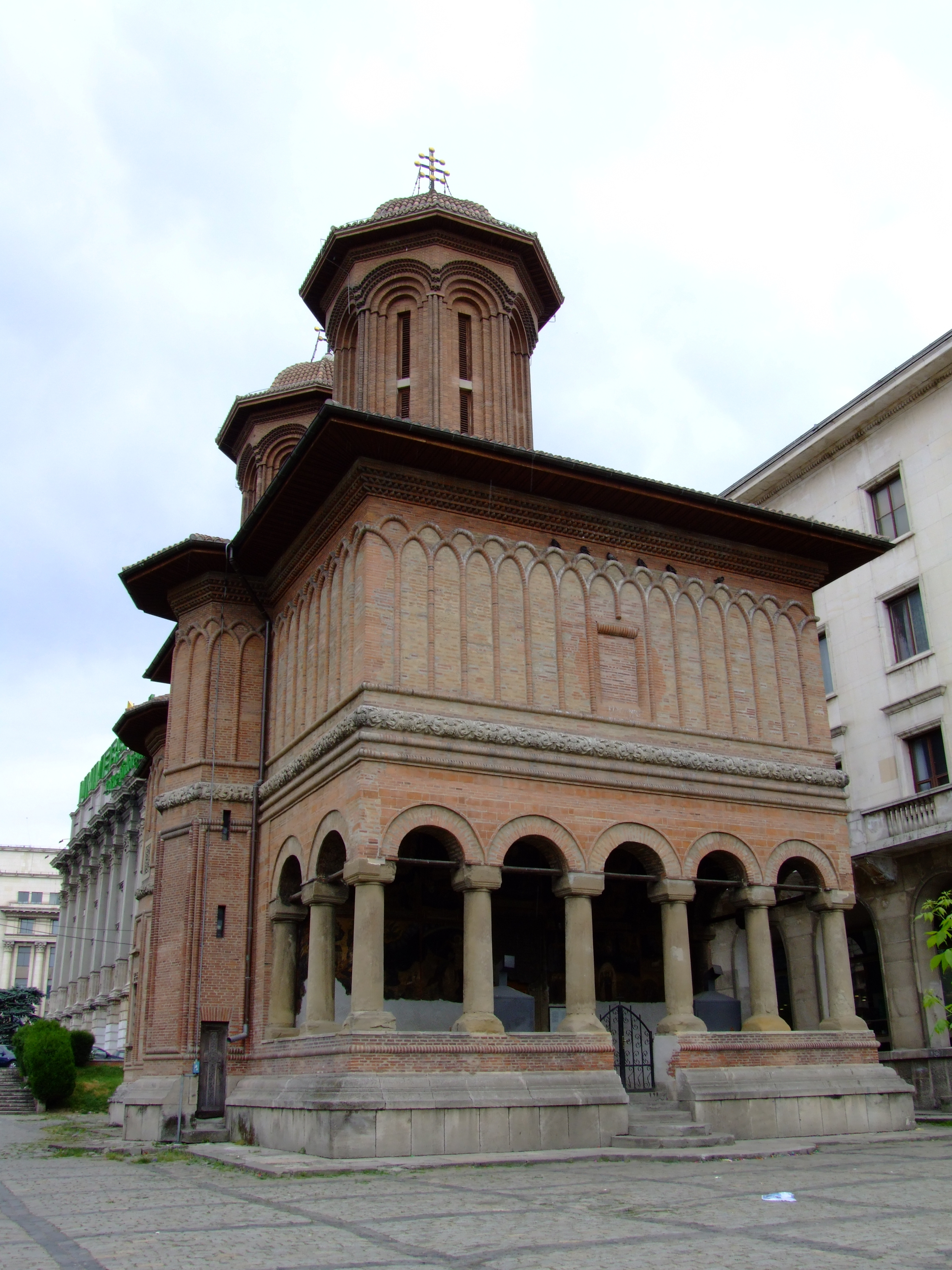
Kretzulescu Church

After the Romanian Revolution of 1989, the new Romanian government refused to give back any of her goods, included her Home Estate or Orphanage.

In mid-1991, she went back to her native country, taking up residence in the attic of her old orphanage, which is nowadays occupied by the City Hall of Bucharest.

She died at age 100 on 26 May 1993. She was buried in the family tomb, in Bucharest. A memorial service was held at the historic Kretzulescu Church.

Her daughter, Alexandra Caradja (a.k.a. "Tanda" Bragadiru Moevs), died in 1997. Catherine was survived by her granddaughter, Princess Brianna “Hélène” Caradja(b. 1960, ex-wife of Bruce Johnson), and two great-grandsons, Constantin Caradja Johnson (1989) and Maximilien Caradja Johnson (1990), and her adopted son, Ottomar Rodolphe Vlad Dracula Prince Kretzulesco (10 October 1940 – 17 November 2007).
