= Constantin Karadja =

Greek-Romanian diplomat and scholar

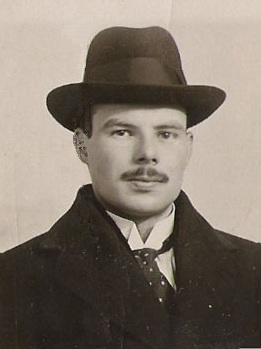

Prince
- Born: 24 November 1889; The Hague, Netherlands
- Died: 28 December 1950 (aged 61); Bucharest, Romania
- Spouse: Marcela Elena Caradja
- House: Karatzas (Caradja)
- Father: Jean Karadja Pasha
- Occupation: Diplomat

Prince Constantin Jean Lars Anthony Démétrius Karadja (24 November 1889 – 28 December 1950) was a Greek-Romanian diplomat, barrister-at-law, bibliographer, bibliophile and honorary member (1946) of the Romanian Academy. He was a member of the Caradja aristocratic family.

== Family ==
Constantin was the son of Prince Jean Karadja Pasha (1835–1894) and Mary Smith Karadja (1868–1943). In 1916 Constantin married a distant relative (her father was second cousin to Constantin), Princess Marcela Elena Caradja (1896–1971) of Romania. They had two children:

- Prince Jean Aristide Constantin Georges Caradja (1917–1993), married to Minna Frieda Auguste Starke (1911–1992).
- Princess Marie–Marcelle Nadèje Karadja (1919–2006).

== Education and studies ==
Barrister at law in England with studies at Framlingham College and the Inner Temple, he spoke English, Swedish, Romanian, German, French, Danish and Norwegian, as well as Latin and Greek. Being a European by education, at 21 years of age, Constantin Karadja started to work at the Political Department of the Foreign Minister of the Ottoman Empire. However, he resigned in 1912, then he married and established himself in Romania (1916). He was naturalised and joined the diplomatic service in 1920, serving Romania in missions as consul in Budapest (1921–1922), consul general in Stockholm (1928–1930) and Berlin (1932–1941).

With additional solid competences in economics, he also worked as a counsel in the Ministry of Finances, and participated 1927 as chief of the Romanian delegation to the International Economic Conference in Geneva. He composed a diplomatic and consular manual.

== Bibliographical, bibliophile and historic activities ==
Being a bibliophile and collector, Constantin Karadja founded one of the most important collections of old and rare books in South-East Europe, which today can be found partially in the National Library and the Romanian Academy in Bucharest. Being accredited as consul general in Berlin and in parallel to his diplomatic activities, he continued his research concerning incunabula, realising in this period the "List of incunabulum on the Romanian territory".

He published important works regarding the ancient history of Romania. Using unknown sources discovered by his own research activities, he released in 1934 his famous work entitled "The oldest sources published on Romanian history". In 1940 he also presented to the Romanian Academy the first mentions of Dacia and the Romanians discovered in two incunabula from 1454 and 1472. More than half of the numerous scientific articles of Constantin Karadja were published in the three journals of Nicolae Iorga. As a result of his activity as bibliographer and researcher, he was admitted as honorary member of the Romanian Academy on 3 June 1946. His letter of recommendation was signed by eighteen notable academicians, including Ion Nistor, Alexandru Lapedatu, Dimitrie Pompeiu, Gheorghe Spacu, Emil Racoviţă, Iorgu Iordan, Constantin Ion Parhon, Nicolae Bănescu, Constantin Rădulescu-Motru, Ştefan Ciobanu, Radu R. Rosetti, and Silviu Dragomir. He was removed from the Academy by the communist regime two years later, in 1948. After the Romanian Revolution of 1989, he was re-established in 1990.

== Diplomatic activity ==
Influenced by his humanistic and juridical education, Constantin Karadja constantly followed the principles of international law respecting human rights. He did not cede in front of political pressures, "doctrines" en vogue or potential "opportunities", but engaged himself with perseverance in the protection of the rights of Romanian citizens living abroad, regardless of ethnicity or religion. As the Romanian consul general in Berlin (1932–1941) and the director of the consular department of the Romanian Foreign Ministry (15 June 1941 – 17 October 1944), "in both functions, during one and a half decades, Karadja developed an intense activity to save Romanian Jews surprised by the war in the kingdom of death". "Tens of thousands owe their lives to his exceptional persistency, abnegation, determination and amplitude marking his long-term engagement in favour of the Romanian Jews stranded under the Nazi regime." Yosef Govrin, former Israeli ambassador, also writes that it "required extraordinary courage to act as he did through diplomatic means" as he was putting his career in consequent jeopardy. Shortly after his dismissal on 17 October 1944, he was re-appointed by the new foreign minister, Constantin Vișoianu. On 1 September 1947 he was dismissed again from the ministry, this time permanently. This was one of the last measures taken by minister Gheorghe Tătărescu, who one month later, was himself forced to leave his post to Ana Pauker. Subsequently, the payment of Karadja's pension was refused. In an atmosphere of incertitude and menace, he died on 28 December 1950.

== Posthumous recognition ==
On 15 September 2005, Constantin Karadja received from the Yad Vashem institute in Jerusalem posthumously the title "Righteous Among the Nations" during a ceremony in the Israeli embassy in Berlin and in presence of the Romanian ambassador. His diplomatic efforts have been presented in detail on the basis of numerous letters, memos, reports etc. which he sent to his superiors including Mihai Antonescu. These documents can be found in the archive of the Romanian foreign ministry and the Holocaust Museum in Washington, D.C. They are the means by which Karadja saved over 51,000 persons from deportation and extermination—Jews (men, women and children) from parts of Europe dominated by the Nazis, especially from Germany, France and Hungary, but also from Greece and Italy (November 1943 – July 1944).

== See also ==
- Caradja

== Selective bibliography ==
- Eugène Rizo Rangabé, Livre d'Or de la Noblesse Phanariote et de Familles Princières de Valachie et de Moldavie, Athens, 1892
- Constantin I. Karadja: "Incunabule povestind despre cruzimile lui Vlad Ţepes" Cluj, Cartea Românească 1931, în volumul "Inchinare lui Nicolae Iorga cu prilejul împlinirii vârstei de 60 ani"
- Constantin I. Karadja: "Alte Bibliotheken der Siebenbürger Sachsen und ihre Wiegendrucke", Gutenberg-Jahrbuch, 1941, p. 196–207.
