= Henri Delassus =

French Catholic priest and writer (1836-1921)

Monsignor Henri Delassus
- Dean of the Lille Cathedral
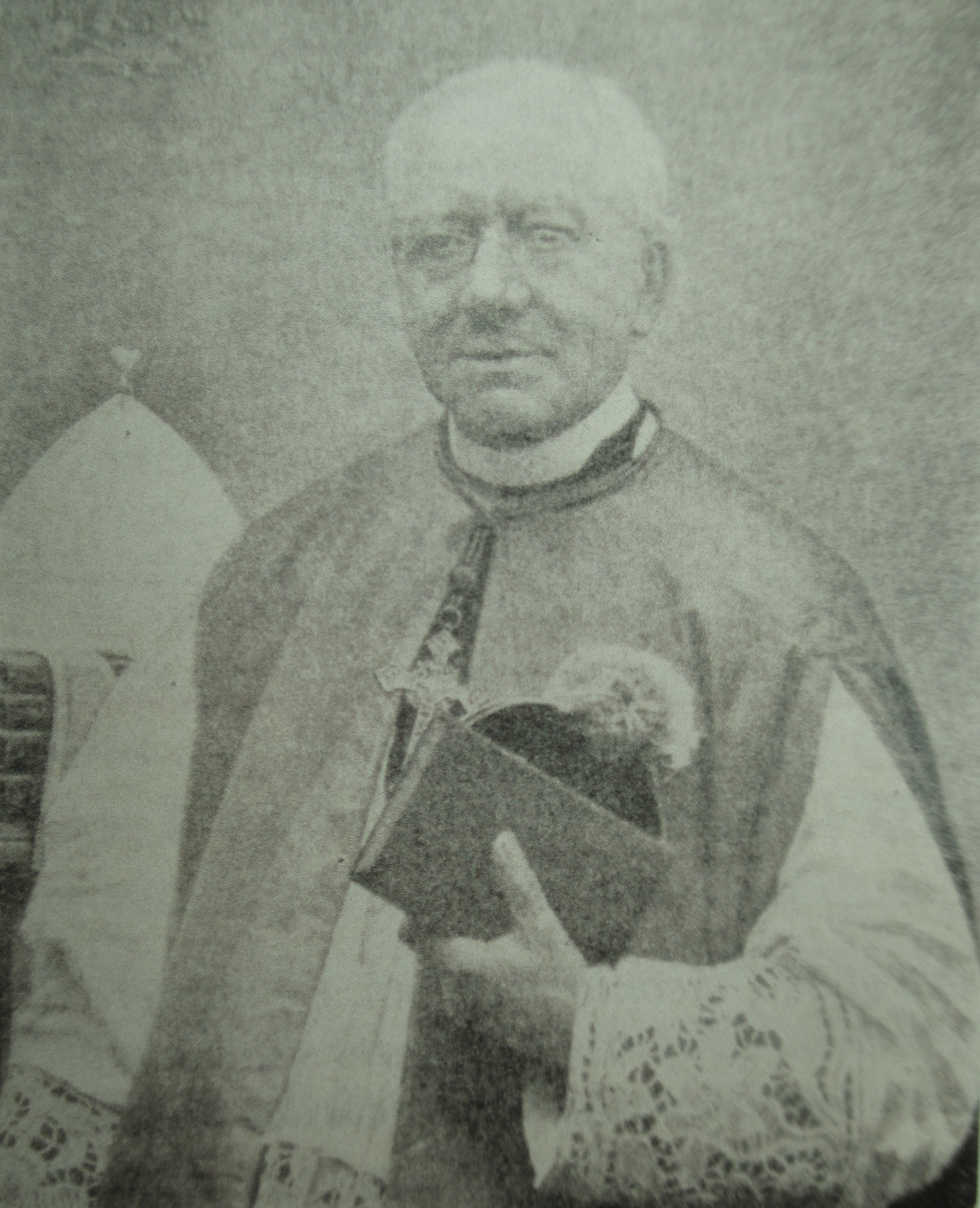
- Portrait of Delassus
- Church: Catholic Church
- Archdiocese: Archdiocese of Cambrai

Orders
- Ordination: 1862

Personal details
- Born: 12 April 1836 Estaires, Nord, France
- Died: 6 October 1921 (aged 85) Saméon, Nord, France
- Buried: Cemetery of Fournes-en-Weppes
- Denomination: Roman Catholicism

Henri Delassus (April 12, 1836 – October 6, 1921) was a French Roman Catholic priest and writer. A member of La Sapinière, he espoused intransigent integralist views in his various books and his weekly newspaper, Semaine religieuse de Cambrai. Delassus was one of the main proponents of Judeo-Masonic conspiracy theory and remains an influential author among French far-right circles.

== Biography ==
Delassus was ordained at Cambrai in 1862 and made a chaplain of the Basilica Notre-Dame-de-la-Treille in 1874. In 1904 he was given a domestic prelature and became pronotary apostolic in 1911. Later, in 1914 he became dean of the Lille Cathedral's chapter.

From 1872 he collaborated with the journal Semaine religieuse de Cambrai, of which he became owner and director in 1875. His funeral was held at the Cathedral of Lille 10 October 1921 and he was buried at his family pantheon at Fournes-en-Weppes.

== Thought ==
Delassus' views have been described as integralist, intransigent and deeply reactionary.

Delassus believed in the existence of a conspiracy between Jews and Freemasons with the goal of destroying European Christendom. In his 1910 magnum opus La Conjuration antichrétienne. Le temple maçonnique voulant s'élever sur les ruines de l'Église (The Anti-Christian conspiracy. The masonic temple seeking to triumph over the ruins of the Church), Delassus states that "for two thousand years, the Jews have had the ambition to conquer the whole world" and gives the supposed plan of the conspirators to destroy France and implement "state collectivism".

To rule the nations it is needed to destroy the institutions that constitute the social order, and particularly the Christian order. That is the goal of the principles of [17]89, of the Rights of Man, of the Liberalism that Freemasonry inoculates in all societies. Through these poisons all institutions are dissolved, killed: Religion, Family, Fatherland, Property, Army, nothing can resist.

In his 1913 book La Mission posthume de sainte Jeanne d'Arc et le règne social de Notre-Seigneur Jésus-Christ ("The posthumous mission of Saint Joan of Arc and the Social Kingship of Our Lord Jesus Christ") Delassus defends a providential view of history, considering French national identity as inseparable from Catholicism and monarchism.
