= Arthur Kitson =

British monetary theorist and inventor

Arthur Kitson (6 April 1859, London – 2 October 1937) was a British monetary theorist and inventor.

== Early life ==
Arthur Kitson, ME, was born in London, England. He was the fourth son of James Kitson of London, and cousin of Sir James Kitson, Baronet. Arthur was educated by private tutors and at King's College, London, where he won the Whitworth scholarship in a competitive examination, being second out of 600 contestants. He came to the United States immediately after college, and worked for the Baldwin Locomotive Company of Philadelphia.

He married Fannie Ernestina Aschenbach in Spring Garden, Philadelphia on 25 March 1886. They had seven children but eventually divorced.

Arthur Kitson knew the Democrat politician William Jennings Bryan and worked for Bryan's 1896 presidential campaign in Pennsylvania.

== Career ==
Kitson was the managing director of the Kitson Empire Lighting Company of Stamford, Lincolnshire, and he held many patents.

In 1901, he invented the vaporised oil burner. The fuel was vaporised at high pressure and burned to heat the mantle, giving an output of over six times the luminosity of traditional oil lights. This device was later improved by David Hood at Trinity House.

== Banking research ==
Kitson was invited to contribute to the Cunliffe Committee on Currency and Foreign Exchange Rates in January 1919. In place of oral testimony, he published his criticism at his own expense and furnished copies to every member of the committee. He later formed the Economic Freedom League with Frederick Soddy and was active in this venture through the 1920s.

== Later life ==
He was declared bankrupt in 1925.

== Kitson's antisemitism and fascism ==
Kitson became convinced Jewish bankers were the cause of his bankruptcy and most of the world's miseries. He sent Ezra Pound a copy of The Protocols of the Elders of Zion even before Pound changed from a money radical to a notorious anti-Semite.

By the time of his death in 1937, Arthur Kitson was the second most influential fascist in Britain, the first being Oswald Mosley. In his late years he was brought to Germany to consult with Nazi Party economists.

== Works ==
- A Scientific Solution of the Money Question. Arena Publishing Company, 1895.
- The Money Problem. Grant Richards, 1903.
- Industrial Depression: Its Causes and Cure. Fisher Unwin, 1905.
- An Open Letter to the Right Hon. David Lloyd George. J. M. Dent & Sons, 1911.
- Trade Fallacies: A Criticism of Existing Methods, and Suggestions for a Reform Towards National Prosperity. P. S. King & Son, 1917.
- A Fraudulent Standard. P. S. King & Son, 1917.
- The Great Pacifist Conspiracy!: A Warning and an Appeal to the British Public. Dolby, 1918.
- Money Problems: A Discussion of the Basis of our Monetary and Credit Institutions with Suggestions for the Establishment of a Scientific Currency System. Dolby Brothers, 1920.
- Unemployment: The Cause and a Remedy. London: Cecil Palmer, 1921.
- The Bankers' Conspiracy! Which Started the World Crisis. London: Elliot Stock, 1933.
  - Audiobook available.
- A Modern Pilgrim's Progress. Oxford: Alden Press, 1935.

Published under pseudonym "A Fellow Pilgrim".

=== Pamphlets ===
- Usury (Payment for the Use of Things): The Prime Cause of Want and Unemployment. s.n., 1910.
- Is a Money Crisis Imminent?: Being the Lecture Delivered under the Auspices of the Banking and Currency Reform League at the New Reform Club, 1 November. Commercial Intelligence Publ. Co., 1911.
- England's Trade Barrier! The Bank Charter Act: An Address Delivered to the Members of the Birmingham Chamber of Commerce, at the Grand Hotel, Birmingham, 17 December 1917. Hudson & Son, 1917.
- Reconstruction Through Banking Reform. Cornish Echo Company, 1918.
- Renewal of the Bank of England Charter: How the Present Banking System Restricts Trade. Birmingham Chamber of Commerce, 1918.
- A Criticism of the First Interim Report of the Committee on Currency and Foreign Exchanges. British Banking Reform League, 1919.
- The Treasury's Latest Craze. Unwin, 1920.
- A Letter to H.R.H. The Prince of Wales on the World Crisis – Its Cause, and Remedy. Oxford: Alden Press, 1931.
- The Science of Plenty, s.n.

=== Articles ===
- "The Logic of Free Trade and Protection." Popular Science Monthly, Vol. 38, November 1890.
- "Fallacies of Modern Economists." Popular Science Monthly, Vol. 42, December 1892.
- "A Criticism of Henry George's Single Tax Theory." The American Journal of Politics, Vol. V, July/December 1894.
- "What is Economic Value?" The American Magazine of Civics, Vol. VI, January/June 1895.
- "The Minimum Wage" (letter). The New Age, Vol. X, No. 18, February 1912, p. 428. Full issue available.
- "Gold and State Banking." The New Age, Vol. XI, No. 13, 1912.
- "A Successful Experiment." The New Age, Vol. XI, No. 26, 1912.
- "The Root of All Evil." The New Age, Vol. XII, No. 17, 1913.
- "The 20th Century Napoleon." The New Age, Vol. XIII, No. 13, 1913.
- "Legislative Quackery." The New Age, Vol. XIV, No. 11, 1914.
- "The War and the Prophets." The New Age, Vol. XV, No. 18, 1914.
- "The Russian Myth." The New Age, Vol. XV, No. 23, 1914.
- "German Kultur." The New Age, Vol. XVI, No. 2, 1914.
- "Messrs. Facing-Bothways", The New Age, Vol. XVII, No. 10, 1915.
- "The Psychological Factor." Land & Water, 4 December 1915.
- "The Financial Factor." Land & Water, 30 December 1915.
- "Treasury Notes: Their Present Advantage and Permanent Value." Land Water, Vol. LXVII, No. 2830, 3 August 1916.
- "Labour, Capital and the State." Land & Water, Vol. LXVIII, No. 2839, 5 October 1916.
- "Property and the State." Land & Water, Vol. LXVIII, No. 2843, 2 November 1916.
- "The Coming Trade War." Land & Water, Vol. LXVIII, No. 2847, 30 November 1916.
- "Psychology of the Workshop." Land and Water, Vol. LXIX, No. 2856, 1 February 1917.
- "The New Morality." Land & Water, Vol. LXIX, No. 2876, 21 June 1917.
- "The Perils of Restriction." Land & Water, Vol. LXIX, No. 2888, September 1917.
- "Our Invisible Rulers." National Review, January 1920.
- "The Trade Slump." The English Review, No. 147, February 1921, pp. 122-136. "An address delivered before the Business Club of Birmingham."
- "The Trade Slump, Its Cause and Its Cure." Industrial Development and Manufacturers Record, Vol. LXXIX, No. 9, 3 March 1921, pp. 134-138. "An address delivered before the Business Club of Birmingham."
- "Farewell to Gold." The Living Age, November 1931.
- "The Bankers' Conspiracy." The Living Age, February 1934, pp. 496-502.

== See also ==
- C. H. Douglas
- Thomas Edison
- Silvio Gesell
- Alfred Mitchell-Innes
- Ezra Pound
- Frederick Soddy
