= Dinu Cocea =

Romanian actor, film director and screenwriter

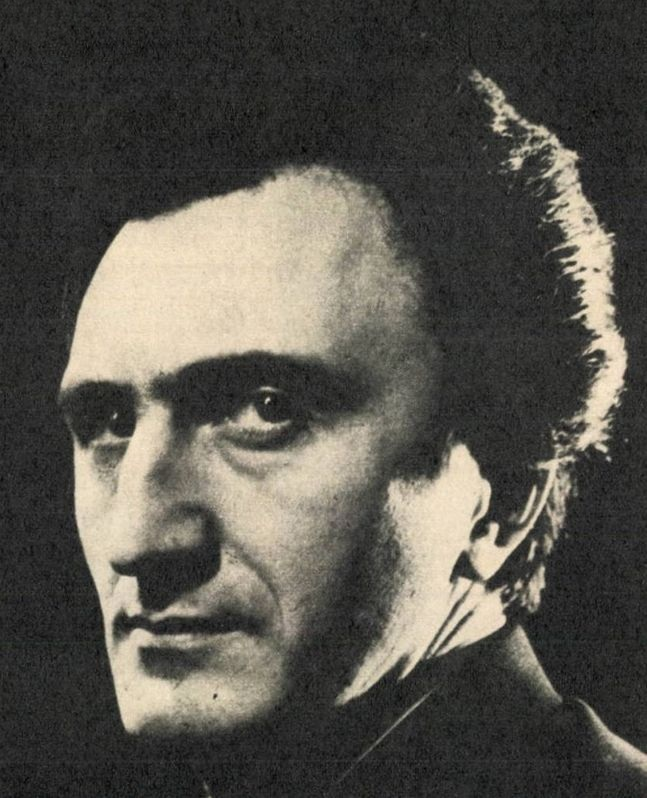
- Born: Constantin Cocea; 22 September 1929; Periș, Ilfov County, Romania
- Died: 26 December 2013 (aged 84); Paris, France
- Education: Gheorghe Lazăr High School; Institute of Theatre and Cinematographic Art
- Occupations: Actor, film director, screenwriter
- Years active: 1958–1982
- Spouse: Elena Cocea
- Children: Oana

Constantin "Dinu" Cocea (Romanian pronunciation: [konstanˈtin (ˈdinu) ˈkotʃe̯a]; 22 September 1929 – 26 December 2013) was a Romanian actor, film director and screenwriter.

== Biography ==
Dinu Cocea was born in Periș, into a well-known theatrical family; his relatives included N. D. Cocea, Alice Cocéa, and Dina Cocea. He completed his secondary studies at the Gheorghe Lazăr High School and then studied at the Institute of Theatre and Cinematographic Art in Bucharest, graduating in 1953.

In 1985 he emigrated to France. Cocea died from heart failure on 26 December 2013, aged 84, in Paris. He was survived by his daughter, Oana.

== Filmography ==
=== As director ===
- Haiducii (1966)
- Răpirea fecioarelor (1968)
- Răzbunarea haiducilor (1968)
- Haiducii lui Șaptecai (1971)
- Zestrea domniței Ralu (1971)
- Săptămîna nebunilor (1971)
- Parașutiștii (1972)
- The Hajduk rebellion – TV series (1972)
- Stejar – extremă urgență (1974)
- Nu opriți ventilatorul (1976)
- Lanțul neglijențelor (1976)
- Instanța amână pronunțarea (1976)
- Ecaterina Teodoroiu (1978)
- Iancu Jianu, zapciul (1980)
- Iancu Jianu, haiducul (1981)
