= Regina Miriam Bloch =

Jewish writer and poet

Regina Miriam Bloch (November 1888 – 1 March 1938) was a Jewish writer and poet.

== Biography ==
She was born in Sondershausen, in the Principality of Schwarzburg-Sondershausen (present-day Thuringia), and educated in Berlin and London. She was the third child of John (or Jacob) Bloch of Edgbaston, Birmingham, editor of the German sporting journal Spiel und Sport (1891–1901).

She settled in London after the First World War and in 1919 launched a public appeal for the formation in England of a Jewish arts and crafts society. She contributed essays, stories and poems to a number of periodicals, and wrote articles and prose fiction for both Jewish and non-Jewish newspapers and publications in the United States, England and the British colonies. Some confusion was caused when it was wrongly claimed that Regina Miriam Bloch was the real name of Rebecca West.

She was noted for a compact treatise she wrote on the life of Inayat Khan and his mission to the West. She was interested in mysticism and contributed articles and book reviews to the Occult Review.

She died in London aged 49.

== Selected works ==
- The Book of Strange Loves (1918)
- The Confessions of Inayat Khan (1915)
- The Swine-Gods and Other Visions, With a foreword by Israel Zangwill (1917)
- The Vision of the King: a Coronation Souvenir (1911)
