= Lars Olsson Smith =

Swedish manufacturer and politician (1836–1913)

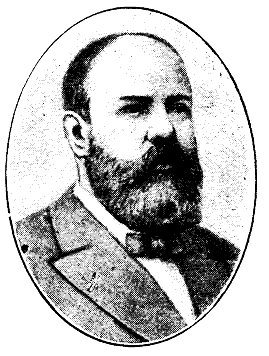
Lars Olsson Smith

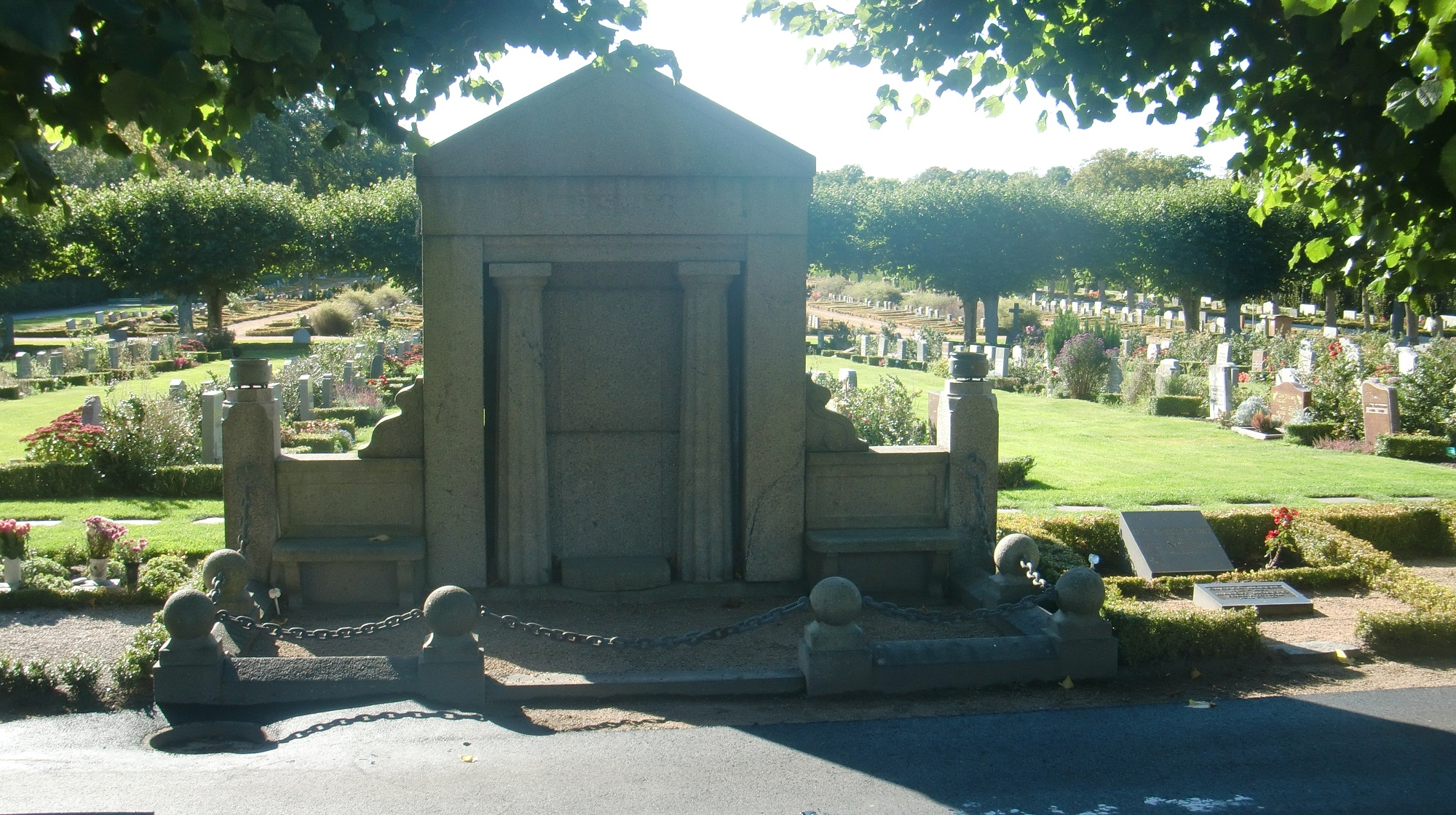
L.O. Smith's grave

Lars Olsson Smith (12 October 1836 in Kiaby – 9 December 1913 in Karlskrona), also L.O. Smith, was a Swedish spirits manufacturer and politician. He was called "The King of Spirits" (Brännvinskungen) because of his domination of spirits production in Stockholm during the end of the 19th century. He started the production of Absolut Rent Brännvin which was later renamed Absolut Vodka.

Smith came from a peasant family in Blekinge and quickly made a career in the retail trade as a 6-year-old.

== Biography ==
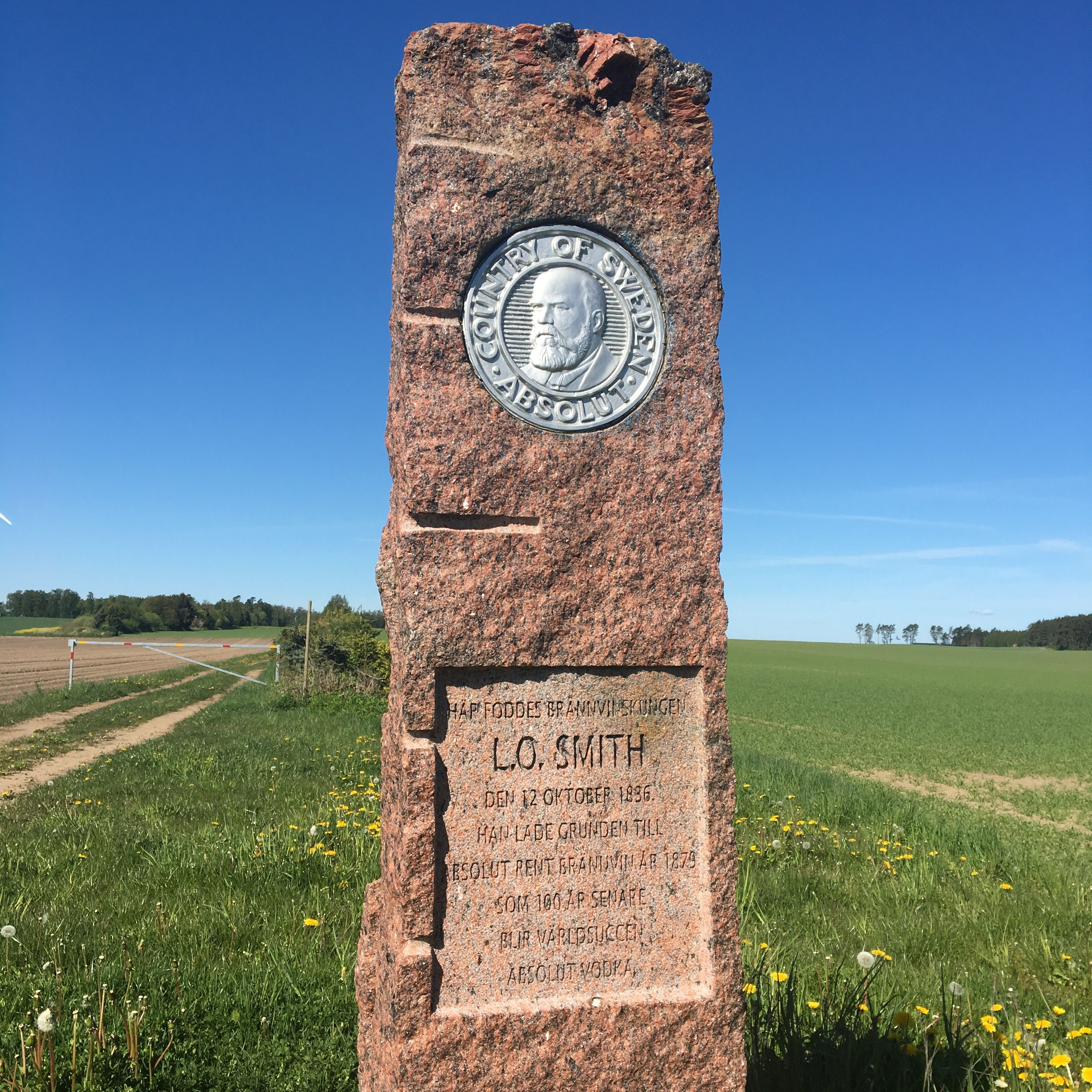
Memorial stone in Kiaby

At the age of 8, Lars Olsson got a position in a general store in Karlshamn after his father's bankruptcy, and was so well-treated by his foster father, consul Carl Smith, that he took his last name. From 1850, he had employment in Stockholm first in the general store, then with a shipping agent. In 1858, he established an agency for a number of distilleries in Scania and Blekinge as well as a modern facility on Reimersholme. The distilleries Smith installed there made him rich by producing spirits with an unusually low fusel alcohol value. The most well-known was the tiodubblat renat ('ten times purified') which ran the communal distilleries out of business. Smith, as a result, faced reprisals from the city of Stockholm and relocated to Reimersholme, outside the city limits. He sold the product from the Fjäderholmarna islands, from which he had boats transport the alcohol to Stockholm.

In 2011, a memorial stone was erected in Kiaby, the village where Smith was born.
