= John Caradja =

Phanariote Greek Prince of Wallachia

John George Caradja
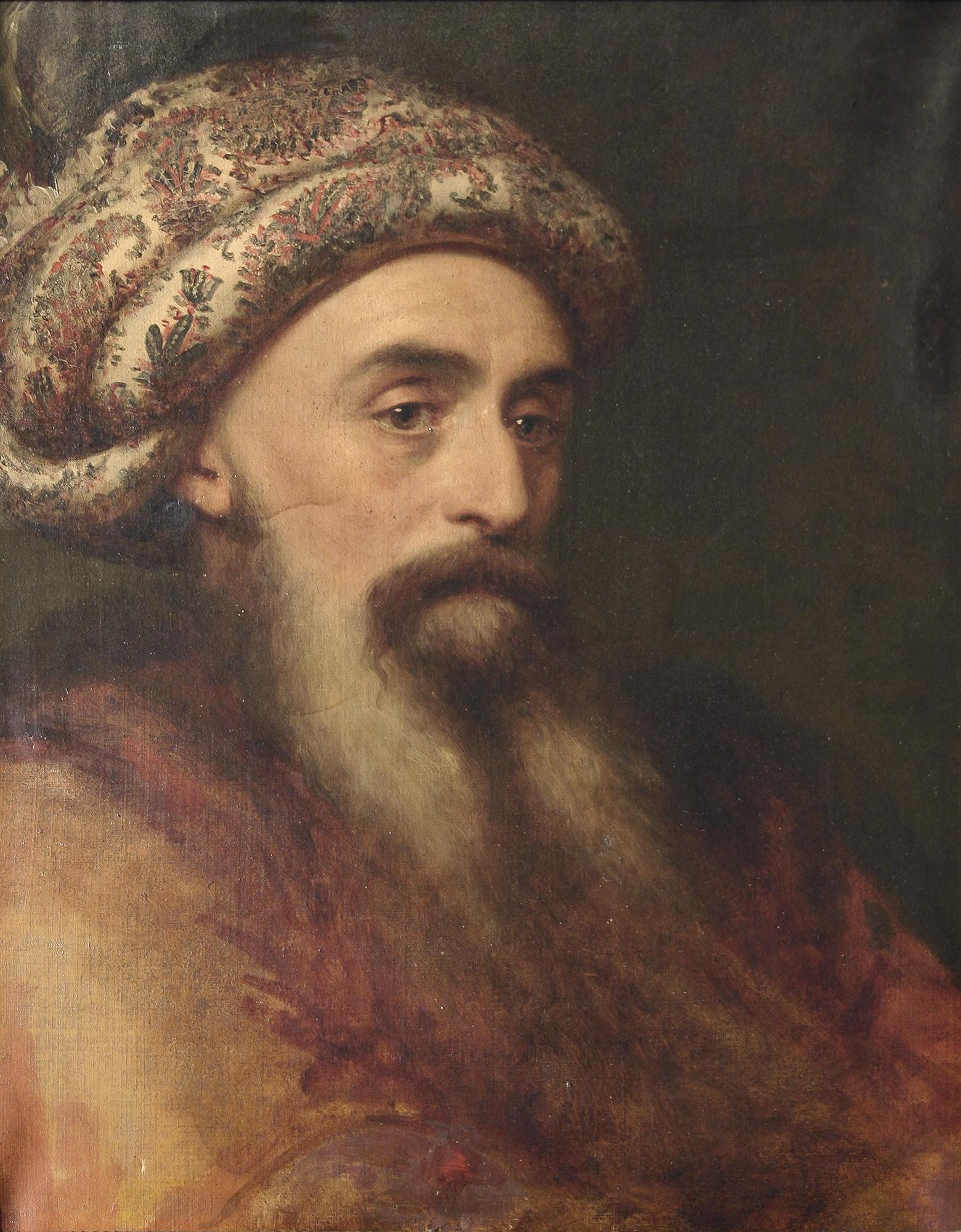
- Italian-school portrait of Caradja, c. 1819

Prince of Wallachia
- Reign: 27 August 1812–11 October 1818
- Coronation: 24 December 1812
- Predecessor: Constantine Ypsilantis
- Successor: Alexandros Soutzos

Chairman of the Greek Central Government in the Peloponnese
- Reign: 9 January–c. February 1822
- Predecessor: none
- Successor: none (Alexandros Mavrokordatos as President of the Executive)
- Born: Ioanni Georgiou Karatzas (Ἰωάννης Γεωργίου Καρατζάς); 1754; Istanbul, Ottoman Empire
- Died: 27 December 1844 (aged 89 or 90); Athens, Kingdom of Greece
- Burial: 29 December 1844; Saint George Church of Kolokynthou
- Spouse: Eleni Skanavi
- Issue: Roxani Soutzos; Rallou Argyropoulos; Smaragda Mavrogenis; Georgios Karatzas; Konstantinos Karatzas
Regnal name
- Ioan Gheorgh[i]e Caragea (Їωан Геωргïє Караџѣ)
- House: Karatzas (Caradja)
- Father: Georgios Karatzas
- Mother: Sultana Mavrocordatos-Karatzas
- Religion: Greek Orthodox
- Occupation: Diplomat, translator, theatrical promoter

John George Caradja, also known by his regnal name Ioan Gheorghe Caragea (Greek: Ἰωάννης Γεωργίου Καρατζάς, romanized: Ioanni Georgiou Karatzas; pre-modern Romanian: Ioan Gheorghie Caragea, Cyrillic: Їωан Геωргïє Караџѣ; French: Jean Georges Caradja, Caradgea, or Caradgia; Italian: Giovanni Caradza, Caragia, or Caraggia; Turkish: Yoan Corc Karaca; 1754 – 27 December 1844), was a Phanariote Greek Prince of Wallachia, who reigned between August 1812 and September 1818. He was the second, and last, member of the Karatzas or Caradja family to ascend to the Wallachian throne, but one of several to have also held office as Great Dragoman of the Ottoman Empire. Caradja, whose life is relatively obscure up to that point, held two terms as Dragoman (1807–1808, 7–27 August 1812). Before 1800, he also embarked on a literary career, participating in the spread of Enlightenment literature throughout the Rum Millet, and becoming noted for his translations from Carlo Goldoni. His progeny included Rallou Karatza-Argyropoulos, who was famous in her own right as a pioneer of modern Greek theater.

Caradja's reign came at the apex of Phanariote influence in the Danubian Principalities, a time marked by political corruption, outside interference, and, increasingly, the affirmation of Romanian nationalism as an alternative to Greek hegemony. His candidacy in Wallachia was supported by Halet Efendi and the Austrian Empire, and made possible by large sums of money that Caradja intended to recover from taxes. He arrived in Bucharest just as Wallachia was recovering from a Russian occupation, and was involved in punishing those whom he regarded as Russophiles—his clampdown resulted in the death of Abdullah Ramiz Efendi and the expulsion of Manuc Bei; the latter spent his remaining years attempting to have Caradja deposed. Caradja was then involved in securing jobs for his Greek retinue or in trafficking high offices in exchange for bribes; in order to meet Ottoman fiscal demands, but also his own financial goals, he created an infamous system of spoliation which perplexed foreign observers and angered the Wallachian public. Having to deal with an outbreak of brigandage, Caradja became known for enforcing capital punishment, as well as torture and amputation.

Shortly into his rule, Wallachia was struck by a wave of the Eastern plague pandemic, locally known as "Caragea's plague". Failing to impose a total quarantine, the Prince successfully isolated himself and his court, while the general population was left to deal with the effects. During the period of recovery, Caradja adopted more lenient positions consonant with enlightened absolutism, and his respect for civil liberties was written down in the 1818 code, Legiuirea lui Caragea ("Caradja's Law"). He afforded Wallachian natives a victory by allowing Gheorghe Lazăr to teach a Romanian course at his refurbished princely academy, and also made some efforts to reintegrate disgruntled nationalists into his administration. Though he continued his lavish spending, Caradja became aware that an accounting audit would result in his deposition and death; during his final months in power, he cut down taxes and announced reforms. He also sought to appease the Sublime Porte by intervening to curb the Second Serbian Uprising, and was credited, possibly mistakenly, with murdering the Serb rebel Karađorđe.

Made aware that he had fallen into disgrace at the Porte, and betrayed by his son-in-law Michael Soutzos, Caradja took his family and fortune out of Wallachia in September 1818. He lived in the Swiss Confederacy and the Grand Duchy of Tuscany, supporting the Greek War of Independence, and becoming nominal head of the revolutionary government in the Peloponnese. In his late sixties, he tried but failed to impose himself as a figure of influence in the Hellenic State; he eventually returned to live as a regular citizen in the newly formed Kingdom of Greece, publishing editions of his translations from Goldoni, and dedicating himself to advancing theatrical life in general. He remained generally vilified in Romanian literature and folklore, though he received positive recognition for his leniency toward the outlaw Iancu Jianu. Following John's death, the Caradjas split into Ottoman–Romanian and Greek branches, respectively led by his sons Konstantinos and Georgios.

== Biography ==
=== Early life and career ===
According to various accounts, the Caradja family originated in the Republic of Ragusa, the Beylik of Karaman, or the Despotate of Epirus. The name is Turkic and means "roe", being read by Romanian scholar Nicolae Iorga as an indication of the Caradjas' "Asiatic origin". John's great-grandson, Constantin Jean Karadja, proposed that the first family was first attested in the 11th century when an Argyros Karatzas served the Byzantine Empire as Duke of Dyrrhachium. He sees him and other early Karatzas as Hellenized Pechenegs. Another historian, C. G. Patrinelis, sees the clan as probably Karamanlid. Supporting the Epirote or generically Greek hypothesis, authors such as Panagiotis Soutsos and Epaminonda Stamatiade believe that they acquired their aristocratic rank and surname while serving in the Crimean Khanate. The clan was attested within the Phanariote community during the mid-16th century; shortly after, their careers became intertwined with the history of the Danubian Principalities, Wallachia and Moldavia—both of which were tribute-paying vassals of the Ottomans. In the 1560s, when one of Constantine Karatzas' daughters married an Ottoman potentate, Skarlatos "Iskerlet" Beylicci, she signalled the family's political ascent; a century later, Constantine's descendant, Costache Caragea, was serving as Postelnic in Moldavia. He is the common ancestor of all Wallachian Carageas.

The future John Caradja was the son of Great Dragoman Georgios Karatzas (1697–1780), and had an uncle, Nicholas, who preceded him as both Great Dragoman (1777–1782) and Wallachian Prince (1782); another uncle, Joannicius, was Patriarch of Constantinople in 1761–1763. According to Prussian consular reports, Nicholas, ultimately sacked by the Ottomans for "having neglected the upkeep of bridges throughout Wallachia", was somewhat supportive of reestablishing the Greek empire. This stance seeped into his translations from Choiseul-Gouffier, which were regarded with suspicion by the Sublime Porte. Born in Istanbul in 1754, John had two brothers, Constantine and Skarlatos, and a sister, Eleni. Their mother Sultana was a Mavrocordatos; through her, John was the grandson of John II Mavrocordatos, who served as Moldavian Prince in the 1740s, and uncle of Alexandros Mavrokordatos. Through this branch, he was also a distant descendant of native Moldavian royalty, leading back to Stephen the Great.

Little is known about John himself before the age of 55, when he took over as Great Dragoman; an oil portrait, probably done in 1795 (four years after Nicholas' death) shows him wearing the clothes of a high Ottoman dignitary, though it remains unclear whether he actually held any offices at that time. He first came into contact with military and political figures of the Habsburg monarchy during the preceding Habsburg–Ottoman War, when he served as a translator for armistice negotiations in Giurgiu (September 1790); in early 1792, he visited Prussia and performed similar duties. Historian Arnold Winckler describes Caradja as the secretary to Dragoman Constantine Ypsilantis, noting that this position brought Caradja into contact with a diplomatic agent of the Habsburgs, Franz von Fleischhackl. During 1792–1793, Ypsilantis published the military training manual Usūl ü Fenn-i Harb, which was based on Marquis de Vauban's Traité de la guerre en général. Turkologist Johann Strauss argues that Caradja may have been the work's secondary author. 21st-century archival research has uncovered Caradja's contribution as a translator of Enlightenment poetry: by 1800, he had produced manuscript versions of Demofonte, Ipermestra, and L'isola disabitata. He married Eleni Skanavi, the daughter of a banker, whose aunt was the wife of Nicholas Mavrogenes (Prince of Wallachia in 1786–1789). The couple had five children. The best known among them is Princess Rallou, born in 1799 at Istanbul, who married Georgios Argyropoulos (or Arghiropol); another daughter, Roxani or Roxandra, known to have been born in 1783, was the wife of Michael Soutzos from 1812, while the youngest, Smaragda, married Spyridon Demetrios Mavrogenis; John and Eleni's two sons were called Georgios and Konstantinos (the latter of whom was born "around 1799").

The Karatzas' political triumph coincided with the Eastern Question, which saw a frail Ottoman Empire attempting to recover its losses with increased taxation, while the Principalities became a target for competition between the Habsburgs and the Russian Empire; in both settings, the non-native Phanariotes were important players. During Nicholas' reign, Habsburg diplomats claimed that Wallachia was falling into Russian hands. Acting on the Ottomans with "extreme rudeness", they obtained his swift removal. The rejection of outside pressures was also becoming noted before John took charge: a wave of peasant riots in 1804–1805 was followed by a more peaceful interval, which lasted to 1811 when 800 Bucharest merchants staged a protest against new taxes.

Seal used by Caimacam Georgios Argyropoulos in 1813

Caradja first served as Grand Dragoman between 19 October and 18 November 1808, just as Sultan Mahmud II was consolidating his reign; P. Soutsos later recounted that, during his tenure, he managed to persuade Mahmud not to carry a murderous purge of the Greek Orthodox community—as argued by C. J. Karadja, this information is probably false. In 1808–1809, a homonymous cousin, John N. Caradja, himself noted for his literary translations, took over John's position as Grand Dragoman. John's own prospects changed for the better after the Russo-Turkish War of 1806–1812. He began his second stint as Dragoman on 7 August 1812, replacing Panagiotis Moutouzis, and subsequently worked to become Wallachian Prince, hoping to outplay his powerful rivals from the Mourouzis family. His candidacy was publicly backed by the Austrian Empire, formed in 1804 from parts of the older Habsburg realm, as well by the Ottoman intriguer, Halet Efendi. He reputedly rewarded intercessions on his behalf with 8,000 bags of Guilder, a "colossal sum" that he intended to recover from Wallachia's taxpayers. According to notes kept by the French émigré Alexandre de Langeron, Caradja surpassed all Phanariote candidates in being both "greedy and unrepentant" with his quest for the throne. Mahmud finally awarded Caradja his throne on 27 August 1812, though he only presented him with the ceremonial fur hat on 22 October, at a time when the plague pandemic was killing 3,000 Istanbul residents each day. During these dates, regal power in Wallachia was held by Rallou's husband Argyropoulos, as Caimacam. Both the Caimacam and the Prince were closely supervised by the Ottoman authorities of Ruschuk.

=== Rule ===
==== Inauguration ====
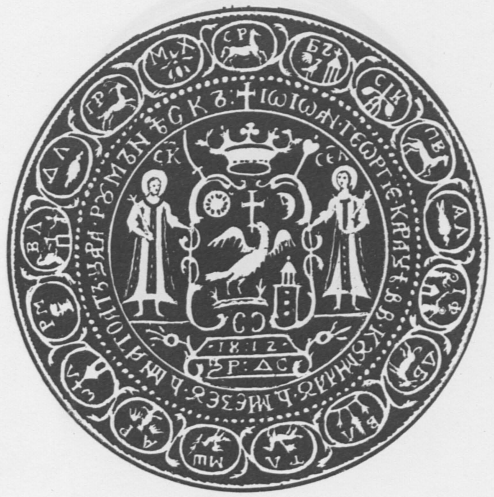
Great seal of Caradja as ruler of Wallachia, 1812

Like the parallel appointment of Scarlat Callimachi in Moldavia, Caradja's was meant to cover a seven-year term, as pledged by the Ottoman firman of 1802. Bucharesters openly rejoiced in the news, but merely because it signaled the end of a detested Russian presence: "Stuffed dolls, dressed like the Moskals, were put up on poles, paraded by the people around Bucharest, doused in mud, and finally set alight. Merrymaking lasted for three days between 15 and 18 October 1812, with lights being put up throughout the city and shots being fired uninterruptedly." The investiture also arrived with what was widely read as bad omens such, including a major frost described by the Wallachian scribe Dionisie Fotino: "[during the 1812–1813 winter there were] scores of calamities, with thousands of cattle big and small, as well as people, being wiped out by the weather which caught them out on the fields, or on the roads."

The new ruler only crossed the Danube on 4 December, and came within reach of Bucharest on 6 December, when he set up camp at Văcărești. Still without entering the city, he curbed all celebrations, making sure that the high-ranking country aristocracy, or boyars, knew of his hostility toward them and their alleged Russophilia. While announcing that the people could expect more leniency, he was in fact focused on distributing all lucrative offices among his own Phanariote associates. As reported by memoirist Ștefan Scarlat Dăscălescu, both Caradja and Callimachi had with them "hordes of famished Greeks", reserving them the offices of Postelnic, Great Ban, and all high-ranking Ispravnici. One estimate suggests that he collected at least 500,000 Turkish piasters from this activity alone—including 30,000 from the Frenchman Filip Lenș. Caradja disguised himself in order to visit his designated palace, Curtea Nouă, which had been damaged by the Imperial Russian Army during its use as a field hospital. The place burned down on 22 December, shortly after having been refurbished.

The Prince only made his official entry into Bucharest on 24 December. He opted not to use the building as his residence, and instead rented two boyar homes, one of them owned by Grigore Dimitrie Ghica, outside Curtea Veche. He quickly transformed these into a makeshift palace that stood out for "bringing together all styles of Europe and Turkey", with frescoes done by Italian artist Alberto Giacometti. Caradja used St. Nicholas in-a-Day Church as his family chapel; he ordered the construction of a covered footbridge leading directly from the palace and into that building, tearing down part of its south wall. It was in this new residence that Caradja held court as chief justice of Wallachia. The procedures were witnessed in February 1813 by a foreign visitor, Count Auguste de Lagarde, who commented on Caradja's nepotism and corruption: "he gave boyar offices to a few commoners who had paid large sums for their diploma and ended this memorable session by breaking his flail on a boyar of the court—a one-eyed man who stood accused of having insulted Princess Rallou".

Immediately after his enthronement, Caradja was becoming known to locals as harsh and swift in carrying out justice. His Serdar, Diamandi Djuvara, began a complex operation to hunt down brigands. In 1812, Atanasie Vastă of Târgoviște was whipped and exiled for having assaulted his own father, with Caradja reminding him that the usual punishment involved the amputation of both arms. Believing himself a murder suspect, the young boyar Dimitrie Foti Merișescu recalls his terror at ending up as Caradja's prisoner: "on quite a few Saturdays, he would impale thieves. [...] also on Saturdays, the convicts imprisoned, in some cases, he would chop their arms off with an axe, in others he would carve out their noses and ears". A Moldavian youth, Teodor Vârnav, recalls of his visit in May 1813: "The first sight I caught upon reaching outer Bucharest was this: two men impaled, but still alive, and another one likewise hung by the neck." As seen by Dăscălescu, these punishments had little effect in curbing crime, especially since brigands or hayduks enjoyed a solid reputation as anti-establishment heroes.

Caradja also welcomed in his palace Joseph Ledoulx, the French Empire's envoy to Wallachia, who recalled that Caradja made sure to avoid relevant diplomatic subjects, instead of focusing on showing his court as both splendid and peaceful—"he proved to me that the role of king [sic], which he had only been playing for two months, was neither hard nor unpleasant." Ledoulx reports that the court included boyars, slave girls, as well as "all sorts of nobodies" who lived exclusively on princely handouts. The court's reliance on princely boons and titles was also commented on by Caradja's Swiss secretary, François Recordon, who was puzzled by its sartorial components. According to Recordon, Wallachian boyars would spend lavish amounts on clothes and jewelry, including kalpak headgear that he measures as "at least five feet across". As one of his first acts in power, Caradja called on his friend Fleischhackl, who was serving as Austrian consul in Bucharest, to help him import 100 pounds of snuff, which he then sent as a thank-you bribe to Sultan Mahmud. When Fleischhackl had his first audience with the Prince, he found himself pestered by the latter's retinue, and only stopped them from following him by paying them bribes totaling 387 piasters.

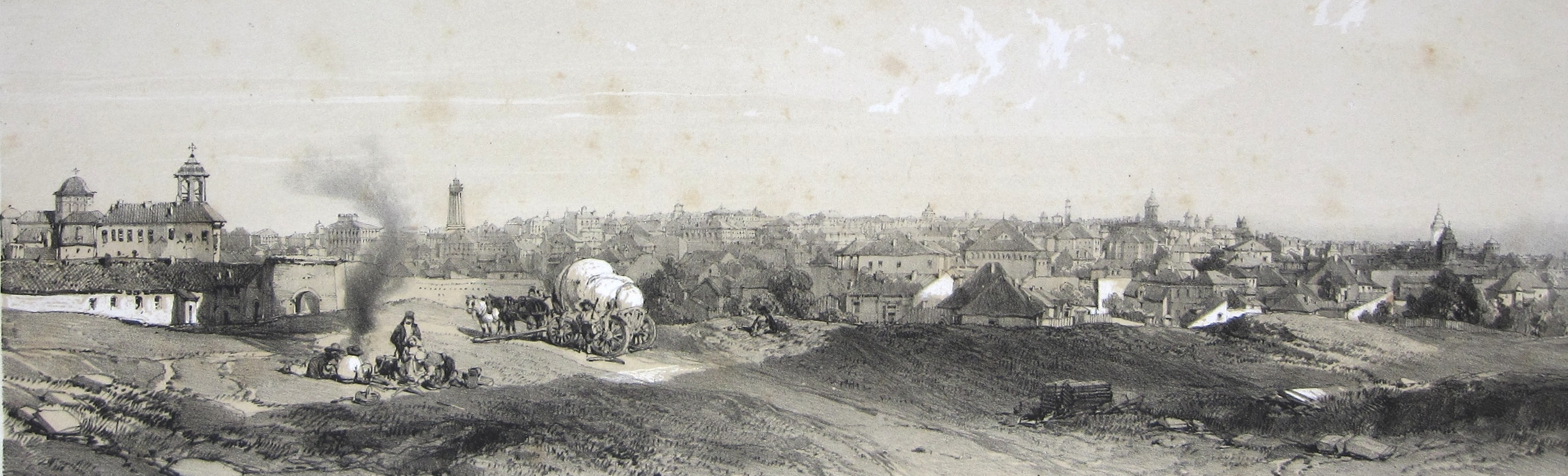
View over the remains of Curtea Nouă and Dealul Spirii, in an 1841 etching by Eugène Cicéri and Michel Bouquet

==== Fiscal regime and state terror ====
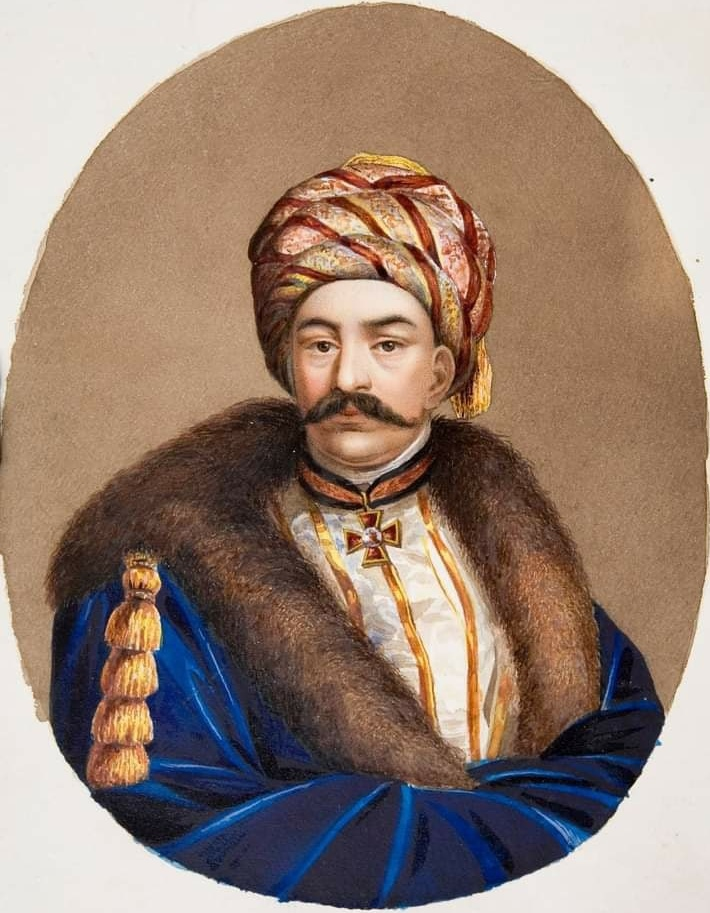
Watercolor portrait of Caradja's enemy Manuc Bei, made during his time in exile

Initially, Caradja was successful in blocking out the Eastern plague, which during 1812 only touched Teleorman County; on 10 December, he ordered that any plague fatalities be dragged out with hooks and buried in a mass grave. He also ordered Bucharest's health inspector, Archisatras, to give him routine reports on any signs of disease. The country's economic decline, worsened by months of Russian military occupation, did not prevent Caradja from instituting new fiscal policies which the population at large perceived as absurdly harsh. According to reports left by Caradja's enemy Manuc Bei, fiscal innovations were inaugurated by Caimacam Argyropoulos, who pressured Wallachian citizens into paying an additional contribution of 2.1 million piasters, claiming that these were upkeep they still owed to the Russian troops. Manuc also claims that Caradja and Argyropoulos never paid their dues in this respect, keeping the money for themselves while also trading away the cattle and grain that had been nominally requisitioned by Russia. The policies were not fully endorsed by the Wallachian Vistier (treasurer) Grigore Brâncoveanu; within six months of office, Caradja had him replaced with a more compliant Constantin Filipescu. Brâncoveanu's ouster was in itself a highly unpopular gesture.

One of Caradja's steady efforts in this respect involved increasing the number of lude (contributing families or persons), which he intended to raise to 50,000 units from some 18,000. Though he was unable to reach this end goal, he reduced the number of tax-exempt subjects, known as scutelnici and poslușnici, by some 7,000 people, who were very briefly reintegrated with the general population. According to Manuc, Caradja's system was self-defeating, since the administration took money to remove other people from the lude category. Manuc also reports that Caradja was averse to any tax privileges still enjoyed by commercial towns—indifferent to their spoliation under Russian rule, he collected 1.8 million piasters from this group of localities alone. An 1815 note by diarist Asănache Lipianu informs that Caradja "burdened down the guilds as much as he could", while also ordering low-ranking boyars to pay a tax of 18 thaler. More arbitrary demands were made against Russophile boyars such as Alecu Nenciulescu, who had to sell his Bucharest townhouse to Fleischhackl in July 1815.

The Prince exercised increasingly violent pressures on those rural areas that still organized into autonomous communities, or obști, applying extortion and physical torture to obtain land concessions in Brănești. Both Manuc and chronicler Ioan Dobrescu describe these moves as the factor behind a major exodus of Wallachians into neighboring Rumelia; other forms of tax resistance were also experimented—in one incident, all the shopkeepers of Ploiești went on strike. In mid-1813, the Ispravnici of several counties were blocking the export of food and timber to Rumelia, promoting the intervention of Ottoman authorities. As a result of these, Caradja dispatched 300 loggers into Mehedinți County, to help meet the wood quota.

In other ways, the Prince tried to mitigate the unwanted effects of Ottoman policies. When the Austrian authorities of Transylvania received permission to import up to 150,000 kile of grain from Wallachia, Caradja changed the definition of kile to one favoring local producers, increasing the exports tenfold. Dobrescu notes in passing that Caradja's policy of continuing exports of food throughout his reign made these more affordable for the locals as well. By contrast, Manuc accuses the administration of irregularities in this respect as well: "They say that a destitute man will always be on the winning side when he engages in commerce; true enough, but only when the surplus stays with the wretched, when they only have to pay off the customs fee, and not when they are subject to oppression." He thus notes that Caradja's state exporters were instructed to tip the scales, obtaining that one in three kile of grain be robbed away from the peasant producers. Manuc alleges that Caradja similarly confiscated 250,000 sheep, which was 100,000 more than the Ottomans had required of him, and that he sold off the difference at a profit. During this interval, the Prince also obtained and expanded privileges for Bulgarian settlers around Bucharest, who were the city's suppliers of produce, and whose Romanianization he indirectly encouraged. New settlers included Anton Pann, a writer of disputed ethnic origins, known to have been born in Sliven.

From the early days of his reign, Caradja also consolidated permanent links with Austria by making Konstantinos Bellios his permanent agent in Vienna. More significantly, he was also in contact with the Austrian Chancellor, Klemens von Metternich; he instructed Friedrich von Gentz to send Caradja regular digests of the goings-on in world politics, with subtle indications of what Austria desired from Wallachia. These events closely followed the peace of Bucharest, which ended the preceding war—and, to the Ottomans' outrage, included the loss of Bessarabia. Caradja was one of those whom the Grand Vizier Hurshid Pasha asked to purge Wallachia of political figures seen as responsible for that debacle; the latter included Abdullah Ramiz Efendi, whom Caradja beheaded at Colentina, and Manuc Bei, whom he probably tried to lure into an assassination trap. The former deed was praised by Mahmud, who rewarded Caradja with a diamond-encrusted snuff box.

Caradja had more trouble in dealing with Manuc, to whom he owed 175,000 piasters, borrowed early on by Argyropoulos. He sacked his confidants from the offices at the court, but was unable to lure Manuc himself, who was, or pretended to be, bedridden with malaria. Manuc's secretary, Mser Mseriants, recounts three meetings between his employer and the Prince, claiming that Caradja's pressures eventually drove Manuc into a permanent exile. Mseriants also provides details on Caradja ordering Michael Soutzos to seize Manuc's assets and children, but notes that Soutzos failed in both attempts. This was largely because the Russian consul Andrey Italinski received guarantees from the Ottoman court that all Manucs would be allowed to leave Wallachia unharmed. In the end, Caradja only obtained that Manuc be stripped, illegally so, of his own status as Dragoman. That office eventually went to Michael Soutzos, who took a monthly bribe of 80,000 piasters from his father-in-law. Reportedly, Caradja also intended to purchase Manuc's Inn, which was a lucrative business in downtown Bucharest.

From his place of exile in Transylvania, Manuc sought to convince the Porte that Caradja was a bad asset: "this character has collected 4,000 bags of gold within eight months; yet nobody bothers to look into that." Also according to Manuc, Caradja simply sold off the office of Wallachian Metropolitan Bishop to Nectarie, a "wicked man that the country did not love", as well as a "drunk", and similarly auctioned off the Diocese of Râmnic to Nectarie's nephew, Galaction. Caradja took a reported 650,000 piasters from this deal, while Gregory Soutzos, who had helped seal it, received 25,000. A later record by the same Manuc suggests that Caradja extorted Nectarie, obtaining from him (and in fact from the Church itself) an annual bribe of 500–600 bags of Guilder.

==== Plague and aftermath ====
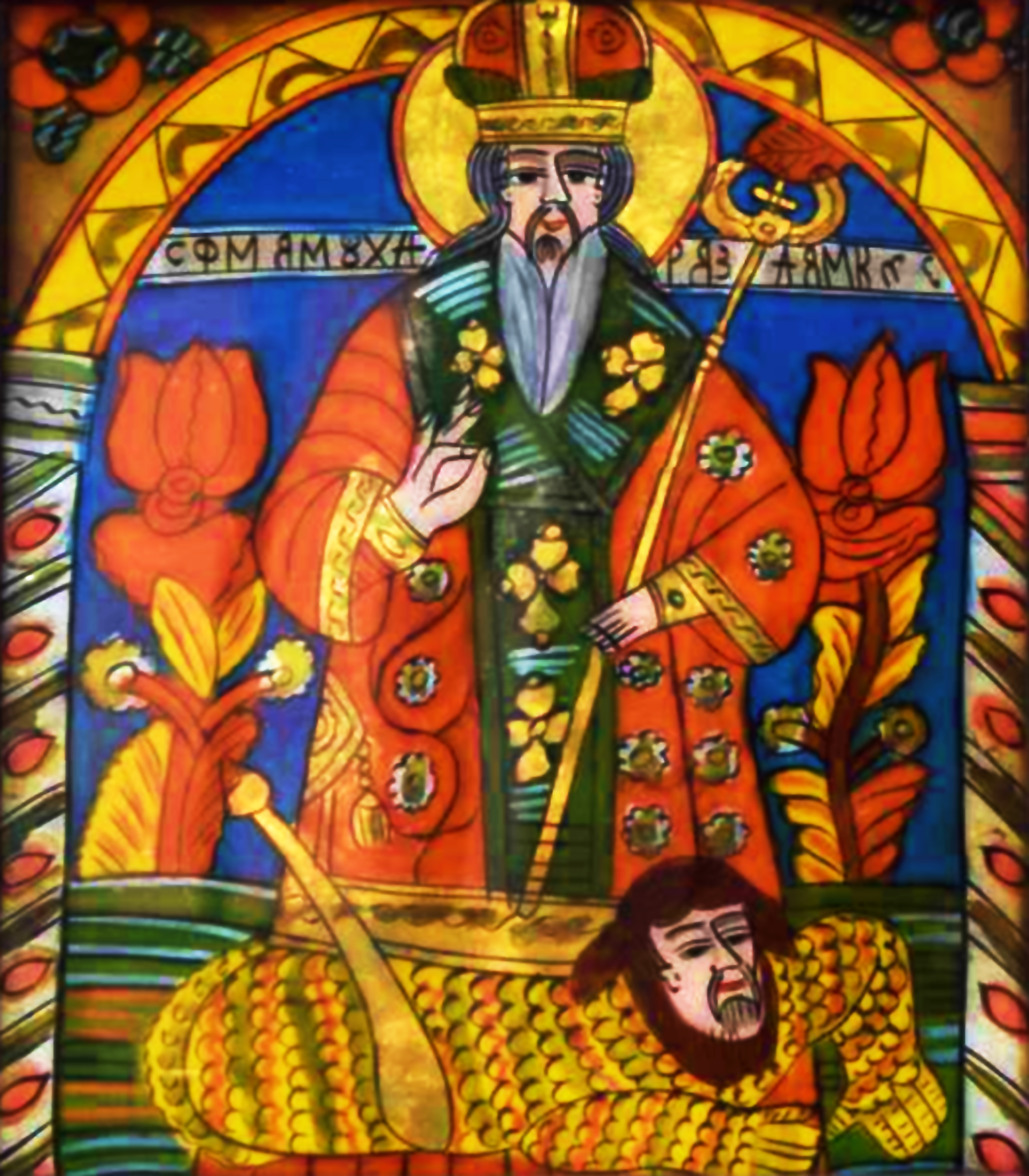
Charalambos destroying the plague, in a 19th-century Orthodox icon from Șcheii Brașovului

By mid-1813, Mahmud was focused on quashing the First Serbian Uprising, which was raging immediately to the west and south of Oltenia. Caradja sent in some hundreds of his Wallachian militiamen, assisting the Ottoman army as it advanced down the Timok Valley, toward Negotin; together, these forces managed to defeat Hajduk Veljko in July 1813. This campaign ran concurrently with the French invasion of Russia and the War of the Sixth Coalition, which drew Russia's attention away from the Ottoman Empire. Enjoying his freedom to act, Mahmud ordered his troops to "destroy all the inhabitants fit to carry arms". Reportedly, Caradja intervened to warn the Porte that Russia was not yet defeated: "Mahmoud caught the hint, his ferocious orders were countermanded, and the Servians [sic] were spared." His contribution to rescuing Serb civilians is "attested by several sources." Also in July 1813, the Prince began persecuting more Wallachian dissenters, including Grigore D. Ghica and Constantin Bălăceanu, by having them sent into exile—the former internally, the latter to the more remote Kastoria. A Brâncoveanu associate, Iancu Cocorăscu, was sentenced to have his arms chopped off.

This purge was interrupted by a relapse of the plague. Consigned to folk memory as "Caragea's plague", it lasted from June 1813 to April 1814 (with a reported peak during January), remaining "the deadliest outbreak of the plague from those reported in the country's annals." Fotino argues that Caradja took precautionary measures against the disease even reaching Bucharest, but was in the end powerless to stop it, losing some members of his court to it. According to Fotino, some 70,000 people died throughout the plague, while Dobescu notes that there were 20,000 fatalities in Bucharest alone. Fatalities increased despite Caradja's attempts to contain the spread with a total quarantine—which included the expulsion of beggars from Bucharest, the closure of fairs in Obor and elsewhere, checks on the number of Jews who could enter Bucharest, and, from August, also a formal curse on Wallachians who failed to abide by the rules. He took a special interest in Jewish affairs, discriminating against those coming in from other parts of Europe, classified as Sudiți, but protecting Jewish guilds. Also in 1813, he appointed a naturalized guild-master, Haim Herș, as community leader (Hakham), instructing him to control Jewish immigration.

Hostile accounts suggest that Caradja was in fact responsible for bringing the disease to Bucharest, with his Phanariote entourage. The Prince himself survived by locking himself inside Cotroceni Monastery. According to Manuc, his venality hampered the relief efforts, which were mostly run by Nenciulescu and private physicians who only took some payments from the poor box. Other reports indicate that Caradja was not to blame. Since "doctors were the first to leave the city [of Bucharest]", he issued writs ordering their salaries to be requisitioned. Museographer Gabriel Ciotoran writes that, overall, Caradja "had a decisive merit in curbing [the plague], with the many decisions that he took under such dire circumstances." A late Wallachian chronicler, Dionisie Eclesiarhul, provides additional coverage on the epidemic and the panic which is created. Together, mortality and flight left Bucharest and Craiova depopulated, and vagabonds in charge of the abandoned goods. Historical memoirist Ion Ghica reports that, in Bucharest's Dudești neighborhood, syndicates of beggars and undertakers, identified by their red scarves, unceremoniously executed the sick or simply left them to die in the open field, after taking their valuables. The phenomenon was noted by Caradja himself in October 1813, when he ordered the arrest of a plague survivor who organized beggars and undertakers into roving bands of robbers. It was also curbed by the victims themselves: in one reported incident, ten undertakers were killed by those whom they intended to kidnap.

The Wallachian administration was able to assist in the relief against plague-related brigandage by again applying state terror. Merișescu, who wandered about Muntenia during the plague, reports that rural areas were quickly pacified for fear of Caradja's "strictness": "should anyone happen to have dropped something along the roads, nobody would pick it up, and there were no thieves to speak of." Caradja was also involved in advancing precautions against other disasters, such as his June 1814 order that all shopkeepers in Bucharest keep and maintain firefighting implements. That same month, he upset the boyars by absentmindedly granting a plot in Lipscani, Bucharest to the clergy serving his court. He was forced to withdraw his donation upon being informed that it was exclusively reserved for impaling malefactors or their severed heads.

During that interval, Caradja cultivated Franco-Wallachian relations and Napoleon's emissaries in Bucharest, including Ledoulx. Mahmud's victory in Serbia was celebrated by Caradja and his court in November 1813; in December, the Prince agreed to welcome in Wallachia Serb emigrants, who were to compensate for victims of the plague. This plan was only partly carried through: in June 1815, members of the new Serb colonies in Craiova, Pitești and Curtea de Argeș were petitioning the court to grant them passports and the right to leave Wallachia. After catching news of France's defeat at Leipzig, the Prince endorsed Russian orders to expel Ledoulx and his staff from Wallachia, which inaugurated a lasting dispute with Antoine-François Andréossy, the French Ambassador to the Porte. Caradja became a champion of the Moldavian boyardom, which asked the great powers to endorse the reunification with Bessarabia. He tried to persuade Metternich, through Gentz, to discuss Bessarabia at the Congress of Vienna, but was advised to drop the issue.

Before and after the plague, Caradja was interested in maintaining his profile as a cultural reformer. During June 1813, he lifted all tax duties on one church from Muscel County, noting its efforts in educating the local children. In September 1814, he also set up a commission, or Eforie, to reorganize the princely academy, under the presidency of Metropolitan Nectarie. The trustees were both Phanariotes, such as Grigore D. Ghica and Caradja's nephew Alexandros Mavrokordatos, and Romanians such as Iordache Golescu; from 1816, Ștefan Nestor Craiovescul became the academy's only Romanian teacher. The school was moved to a new location in Măgureanu Church and placed under a Greek philosopher, Benjamin of Lesbos; however, it remained controversial for only offering classes in Greek and Church Slavonic, a dead language.

==== Legiuirea lui Caragea ====
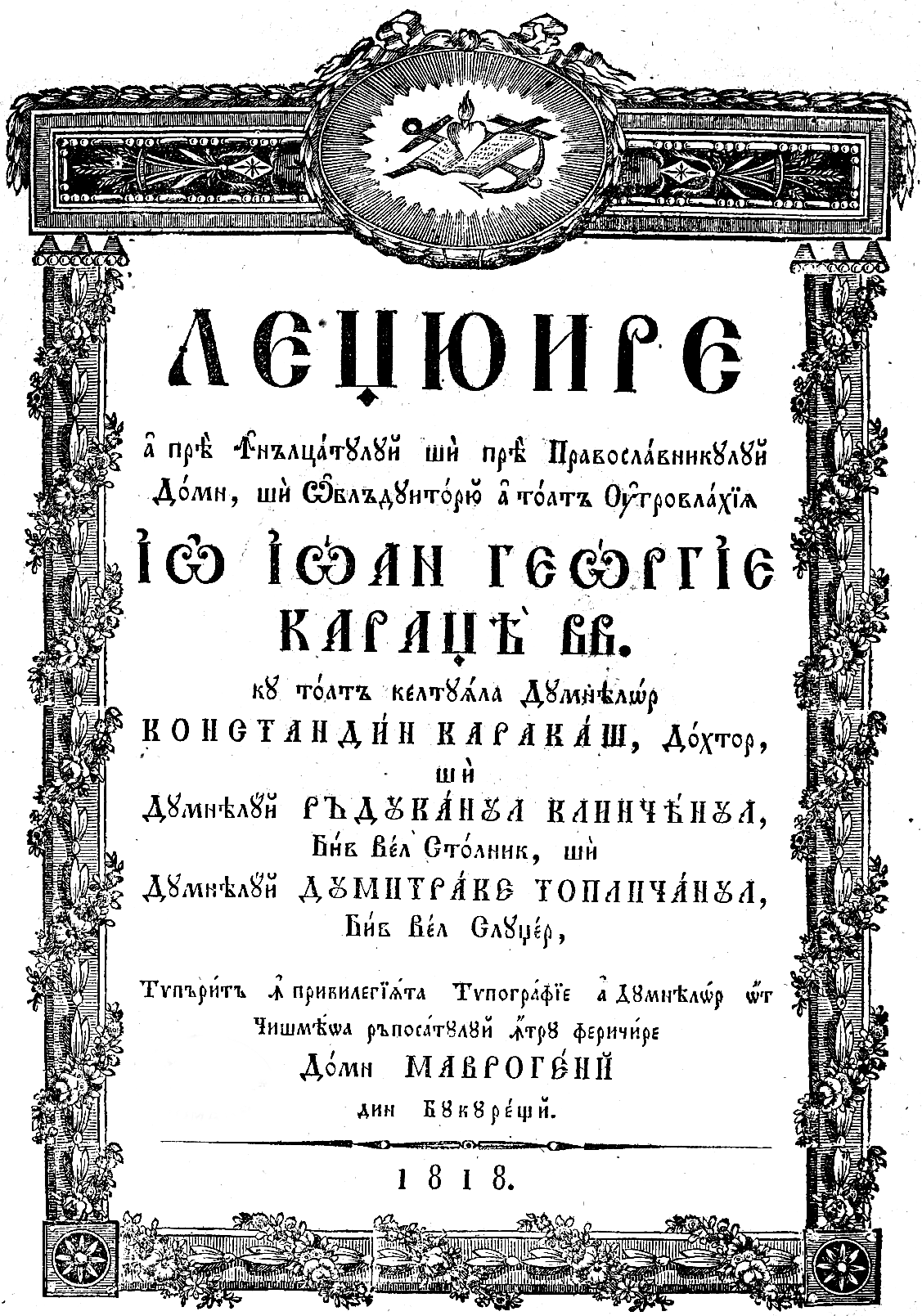
Title page of Legiuirea in its 1818 print, crediting the work's commissioner as Io John George Caradja (Їω Їωан Геωргïє Караџѣ)

According to historian Ioan C. Filitti, Caradja's overall effort should be regarded as part of a Phanariote drive to affirm equality before the law and individualism. The Prince's views on law and taxation were codified into the updated version of Wallachia's statutory law, published in 1818 and known thereafter as Legiuirea lui Caragea ("Caradja's Law"). The work was primarily an attempt at synthesizing Byzantine law and local customs, defining the relations between these two sources. According to Dăscălescu, the result was mediocre, though not entirely pointless "had here been someone to apply them properly". Historian Constantin Iordachi proposes that, in its function as a compilation of private law, Caradja's text was mainly based on the modernizing Napoleonic Code, though still maintaining "an uneven combination on enlightened principles and medieval privileges." Literary scholar Nicolae Liu similarly notes that Caradja shared the Enlightenment's ambition "of achieving the 'common good' or 'general welfare' by legislative means"; he underscores that Legiuirea, along with other codes of the era, "intended to impose the image of certain Phanariote princes as 'trustees of the country' with a paternalistic regard for the people".

Like the contemporary Callimachi Code of Moldavia, Legiuirea showed the end result of enlightened absolutism, as "an effective tool used by the central power in its struggle to control the emerging state machinery." As noted by legal scholar Valentin Al. Georgescu, it remained undecided between sources when it came to inheritance rights, creating an "absurd solution" which excluded some women from inheriting from their father-in-law if they had been widowed before his death. Overall, Caradja's code repressed a tradition of relative gender equality previously sustained by Wallachia's common law, introducing strict agnatic primogeniture, and requiring male children to provide for their sisters. It afforded women "a certain social visibility in accordance with customary law, [but] denied them political rights and some civil rights." Unlike Callimachi, whose code fully endorsed Christian supremacy, Caradja's legal scholars remained entirely silent on the issue of religious discrimination. These legislators were also vague when it came to the naturalization of foreigners: they paid lip service to earlier nativist and discriminatory laws but, as Iordachi argues, never actually enforced them—showing the political power still held by Phanariote families.

Legiuirea was noted in particular for expanding on the previous code of 1780 by introducing more duties to be levied on Wallachia's peasant population. Corvées were fixed at 12 days a year, with two more days added for plowing the fields. This number could not be reduced by the landowners themselves. Some articles upheld and extended the view that peasants could not own any property, effectively transforming their contract into an emphyteusis. The code also broke with Byzantine tradition as interpreted locally by not providing any grounds for the punishment of treason—though its original form, preserved in Greek fragments, specified that the Prince had a final say in all matters, and could invoke capital punishment. In one application of this prerogative, Caradja pardoned the boyar outlaw Iancu Jianu and "married him off to the impoverished daughter of a Greek man". In practice, the system only specified death as the penalty for three major crimes (premeditated murder, robbery, and counterfeiting), but both it and torture could be applied at the Prince's pleasure.

With the outbreak of the Second Serbian Uprising in April 1815, Wallachia's grain trade was perturbed by immediate Ottoman demands. Caradja was forced to ask the Austrians for the right to import food from Bačka and the Banat, in exchange for a promissory note. The state continued to be unrelenting in its taxation, as recorded by traveler F. G. Laurençon. Laurençon reports that one tax collector beat up a pregnant woman who died as a result; Caradja had the culprit tried and sentenced to partial mutilation, after which "he returned home to surely perform more such misdeeds." The plague, meanwhile, still made occasional returns, reappearing in Ilfov and Ialomița during autumn 1814, and striking Râmnicu Vâlcea in December 1815. During the latter outbreak, the Prince formed a permanent health committee led by Postelnic Iucache Arhiropol, and set up a permanent quarantine facility at Plumbuita. Caradja was also alarmed about the spread of leprosy, and in May 1816 ordered Constantin Samurcaș to form a lazaretto in Cotroceni.

==== Boyar nationalism ====
During the secondary plague outbreaks, Caradja and his court left Bucharest for the nearby village of Ciorogârla, which consequently became known as Ciorogârla Domnească or Domnești (from domn, "prince"; see Domnitor); he was often described as a likely ktitor of the local Paraschiva Church, though this was more likely built decades before his reign. Also in 1815, there was an attempted revolt by the Pandurs of Oltenia. During November of that year, Prussian diplomat Ludwig Senfft von Pilsach noted Caradja's optimism, which contrasted the "restless and skittish passion" of his supervisors at the Porte. This referred to Caradja's belief that European peace would be secured by the Treaty of Paris. Ledoulx writes that Caradja was enthusiastic about Napoleon's defeat at Waterloo, and celebrated it by dressing up a mannequin in Grande Armée uniform, which his servants used as a football.

In April 1816, Senfft reported news that an anti-Caradja plot had been uncovered in Bucharest. He later questioned whether this had actually happened, but a Wallachian archival document confirmed that a coup had indeed been prepared by a "revolutionary organization". During June, Senfft transmitted rumors that Caradja's demotion was again being considered by Mahmud: "four carriages have been secretly bought for the new prince who is due to replace prince Caradja." He claimed that Caradja was no longer backed by Halet Efendi, who instead encouraged conspirators to act in Bucharest: "[Halet and his clients] work to give some semblance of legality and treaty conformity to the hospodar's removal, arguing that the prince Caradja, following these two conspiracies which prove the hatred brought on by his avarice, cannot be maintained in his place".

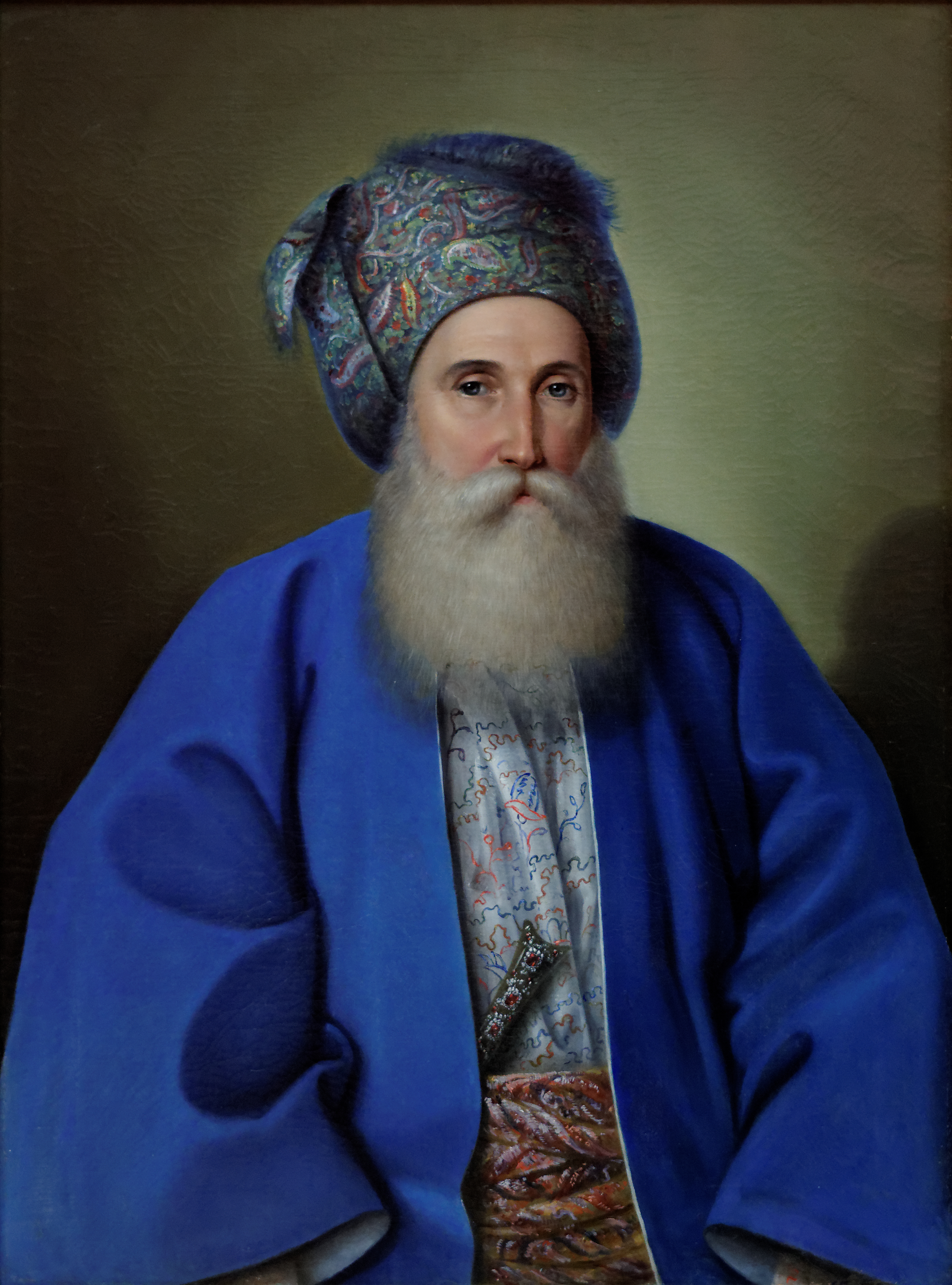
Grigore Brâncoveanu, who led the "National Party" during Caradja, pictured in his traditional Oriental attire

Caradja's projects were increasingly hampered by an upper-class approximation of Romanian nationalism, or "National Party", initially rallied around Constantin Filipescu. This move also channeled support from middle-class Greeks such as Fotino, who had come to despise "Phanariotism" as the proxy of Ottoman despotism. In that context, Manuc advised Russia to mount additional pressures on Caradja. He suggested that Pyotr Lopukhin's government collect on its 1812 debt, which, Manuc argued, would result in the downfall of Halet Efendi and his entire "Austrian" clique. Manuc also claimed that he was in regular contact with Vistier Filipescu and Samurcaș, both of them double-dealers who had kept full records of Caradja's fraudulent accounting. In mid-1816, these reports were heard by Russian Emperor Alexander I, who ordered that Caradja be regarded as a suspect. Russian diplomats who had backed his regime, including Italinski, were reportedly sacked during the investigation, while Foreign Minister Ioannis Kapodistrias was told to maintain permanent communication with Manuc.

The Manuc affair was soon forgotten, largely because Samurcaș changed his attitude and vouched for Caradja's innocence. According to historian Ion Ionașcu, "he responded [to Manuc's requests for information] just as Caradja himself would have answered, had the Porte been looking into his affairs." Manuc himself still championed the cause, now arguing that the full extent of Caradja's fraud could only be known to Ștefan Bellu, who kept the Prince's more accurate and secret records, and who retained for himself part of the boyar salaries. Bellu used such funds in land speculation in Argeș County, emerging as the uncontested owner of Piscani village—which was by then a hub for foreign immigration. Meanwhile, Samurcaș alerted his liege about Manuc's conspiracy to have him removed; Caradja followed up by increasing the bribes he sent to Mahmud, and also by dispatching more of his assets to safety in Austria. During November 1816, he and Callimachi dutifully reported to Mahmud about Russian military maneuvers in Bessarabia. On 1 January 1817, during the New Years' Feast at the home of his son-in-law Constantin Vlahutzi, Caradja announced his court that he intended to cut down on taxes and expenditures; this was days after opening up to the "National Party", by making Brâncoveanu his Spatharios. He was also providing selective tax breaks: in December 1816, he allowed the family of Clucer Dincă Socoteanu to have ten scutelnici.

During February 1817, Caradja coaxed or threatened Nectarie and the boyars into writing him an arz de mulțumire ("thankful memorandum"), for which there was no precedent in Wallachian history. Concessions were also contrasted by Caradja's attempt at imposing strict sartorial regulations, which restricted the use of white to clothes worn by him and his family. The order, passed on 12 January 1817, was immediately defied by the anti-Phanariote boyars: "One of the boyar ladies, Tarsița Filipescu, decked herself in the whitest possible turban, satin dress and cüppe [gown] and ostentatiously rode beneath the windows of the princely court". Caradja ordered her stripped down in case she would re-offend, though she was never apprehended. Eventually, the Prince appointed Barbu Văcărescu as the country's Vistier, deposing and publicly humiliating Constantin Filipescu; in March 1817, he had the whole Filipescu family arrested and exiled to Bucov. The events were recounted to Kapodistrias by Manuc, who was informed in return that Russia did not consider them worthy of attention. Rumors passed on by Dimitrie Macedonski have it that Vistier Filipescu's death later that year was the result of his poisoning on Caradja's orders.

==== Appeasement versus opulence ====
The court itself continued to parade its opulence—in late 1817, Caradja's first-born son, Beizadea Konstantinos, created a stir by driving around in a deer-drawn sled which was decorated to resemble Apollo's fiery chariot. In late 1813, John had made him administrator of Ploiești city and its Romani encampments, which provided him with an annual income of over 200 thousand piasters. All men of the princely family became known for their decadent morals: Konstantinos was a serial seducer, forcing his wife Raluca Moruzzi to file for divorce; John himself would send his court dignitaries on "faraway missions", then forced himself on their wives. Such behavior scandalized an English physician, William Mac Michael. In January 1818, he reported that the Prince's second son, Beizadea Georgios, introduced his mother and sisters to his Wallachian mistress, who had deserted her husband and six children to obtain that position. Georgios was married to Smaragda, a member of the Rosetti Phanariotes (daughter of Dragoman Nicholas), having spent over 8,000 silver francs as alms during their wedding ceremony. Merișescu reports that another one of Caradja's young relatives, Dimitri, married a promiscuous boyaress, Zoe Băleanu, whom he took to his villa in Therapia—where he was serving as Wallachia's emissary, or Kapucu.

At his new palace, Caradja favored the glamorous side of Westernization, introducing sugar sculptures, country dances (including the mazurka), Farobank, and carom billiards. Joining this effort, local Prussians made efforts to increase sales of lager, which they presented to the court. Caradja is said to have hated the taste, but Rallou greatly enjoyed it. Boyaresses were quick to adopt the modern Western attire, while their husbands remained committed to the Istanbulite fashion. During these final years in office, Caradja was sometimes troubled by excess spending, encouraging boyars to adopt habits that were both less wasteful and less Oriental; in March 1815, he banned a card game which went locally by the name of criș. Westernization at the court also tied John Caradja and his daughter to the history of flying machines in Wallachia. On 26 June 1818, they were probably present as "some Germans" flew a hot air balloon from Dealul Spirii in downtown Bucharest—the result of a wager, in which the Prince lost 10,000 thalers that the contraption would never take off. According to a record kept at Govora Monastery, the balloon only came down on 9 June, when it was recovered at Cățelu. A similar experiment had taken place in Moldavia in 1816, making this the second balloon flight in either Principality.

In late 1817, Rallou opened up her Cișmeaua Roșie theater, which showed, among other plays, Voltaire's Brutus. It is remembered as "the first professional (Greek-language) theatrical troupe in the Romanian lands." Her effort was probably backed by a grand boyar, Iordache Slătineanu, otherwise noted for his very first translation of a dramatic text into Romanian (two plays by Pietro Metastasio, published in 1797). Rallou's father was also in the audience: "Everybody stood at attention for Prince Caradja, who came to see his daughter Ralu disguised as a tragic Muse." He was similarly interested in the dramatic arts, producing translations of various plays by Carlo Goldoni (including Il vero amico, Pamela maritata, and as many as twelve others) while still a reigning Prince; these were done in Demotic Greek (the "simple language").

Recordon's accounts suggest that most Wallachian natives, including boyars, were not served by the institutional modernization, being entirely illiterate in their native language. The years 1816–1817 gave rise to disputes over this issue: increasingly nationalist boyars demanded a dedicated Romanian section at the princely academy, but Caradja and Benjamin of Lesbos were very much opposed. As recounted by scholar Ion Heliade Rădulescu, the Eforie debates were heated, with Caradja pretending to seek expert counsel from Benjamin on each new proposal, and receiving the answer nu se poate, stăpâne ("no can do, my liege"). In 1816, responding to demands made by Fleischhackl, the Prince banned a secretive society, called "Brotherhood of the Oka"; its founder, Henri de Mondonville, was a French émigré portraitist with liberal sympathies, who had extended membership to like-minded Wallachians.

In December 1817, Caradja relented to nationalist pressures and created a Romanian-language school within the academy. According to historian Neagu Djuvara, the effort was "surprisingly modern" in advancing standards for staff selection and student examinations. From March 1818, this project was taken over by Gheorghe Lazăr, an engineer and immigrant from Transylvania—who was also one of the first male Bucharesters to wear a Western suit. Lazăr used his position to preach subversive ideas, encouraging Romanians to view Greeks as "oppressors who need to be shaken off once and for all". The Prince was by then moderating his stance regarding the Jews. Their "great freedom of worship", noted by Recordon, was highlighted in 1818, when Caradja allowed the Sephardim to build their own Grand Temple; his regime was also noted for disregarding traditional claims of Jewish ritual murder.

==== Between Karađorđe and Kapodistrias ====
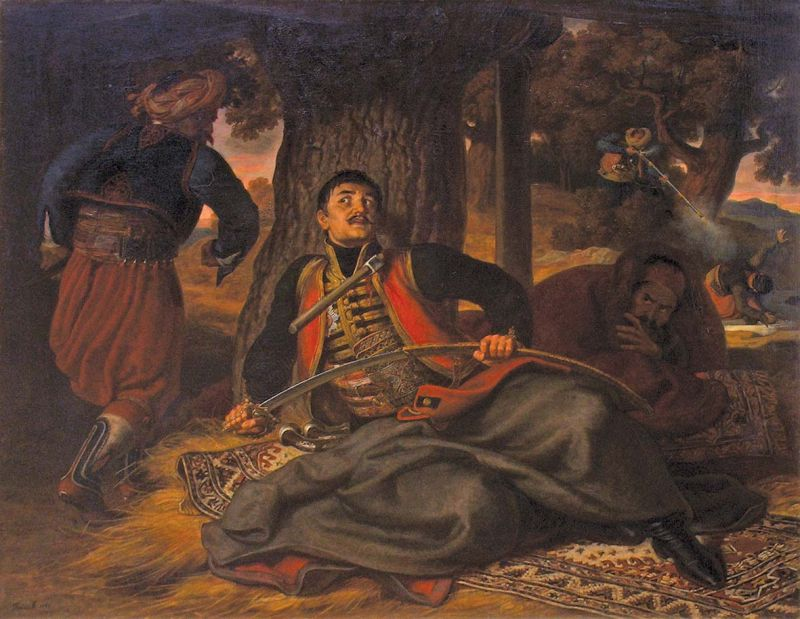
Karađorđe's murder, as depicted in 1863 by Mór Than

Citing earlier pronouncements made by Andrei Oțetea, Ionașcu argues that Caradja's slashing of tax bills was duplicitous, "meant to encumber his successor on the throne with a heavy burden and to leave the somewhat relieved popular masses with the memory of a reign that had been good for the country's finances." Documents from 1818–1819 provide a unique record of Wallachia's budgetary expenditures, which were driven up by the haraç and other Ottoman fiscal instruments, totaling 2 million thalers, alongside undisclosed sums in presents and bribes; the national revenue, meanwhile, was 5.9 million thalers. In documenting the Prince's rapacity for Manuc, Filipescu contended that Caradja had taken almost 10 million piasters in bribes. These included 25,000 from Hagi Stănuță, who wanted to preserve his lease on the textile mill of Mărcuța (though Caradja still sold off the rights to other bidders, in August 1817). Langeron claims that, overall, Caradja had "squeezed that unfortunate province [of Wallachia]" of 93 million piasters, or 50 million rubles, of which he kept 18 million; 70 million "went over to the sultan, to his ministers, and to the Phanariotes". Manuc argued that the sum was much much smaller, though still surpassing the 14 million piasters that were accounted for with receipts.

By 1817, Caradja was trying to prevent another regional conflict over tensions in the Principality of Serbia. After initially seeking to arrest Karađorđe, who was trying to rekindle the revolt in Serbia from Wallachia, he watched on as Karađorđe was killed by his more conservative compatriots. In the aftermath, he intervened to reassure the Russians that their favorite Serb had not in fact been assassinated by the Ottomans themselves, and therefore that the pact between the two regional powers was not violated. In August 1817, he sent Mahmud letters he had received from Miloš Obrenović, in which the latter explained Karađorđe's fate. Caradja also arrested Pandur leader Tudor Vladimirescu and the Greek conspirator Giorgakis Olympios, who were Karađorđe's contacts in Wallachia, but released both upon the discovery that they had Russian consular protection. Halet wrote that Mahmud was well pleased by Karađorđe's murder and that the privately thanked his Wallachian vassal for facilitating it—though this was not necessarily factual.

The Prince was still unable to meet the Ottomans' budgetary expectations, and, as historian Ion Nistor argues, "his services regarding the Serbian question were soon forgotten." As the Russian Ambassador to the Porte, Grigory Strogonov credited Manuc's notes on Caradja, and publicly shamed the latter by refusing to visit Bucharest and accept a bribe. He then made complex efforts to stop Caradja from inventing new taxes, but also to prevent Mahmud from simply replacing him with another Phanariote. This prompted the Ottomans to pressure Caradja into resigning of his own will, which did not formally contradict understandings they had with Russia. Strogonov was alarmed by this ruse, and began advising Caradja on how to handle the pressure. In December 1816, he informed Manuc that he no longer found his reports trustworthy, and hinted that Filipescu was trying to compromise the Russian government. From 1 June 1817, Caradja embarked on a correspondence with Kapodistrias, who became his partisan. He began directing Wallachian treasury funds toward Kapodistrias' "Philomuse Society", which functioned as both an academic club and a subversive group favoring the Modern Greek Enlightenment and Greek nationalism. Kapodistria also sent in Nikolaos Galatis, who represented the radical-nationalist Filiki Eteria; though he refrained from joining its ranks, Caradja allowed Mavrokordatos and Beizadea Konstantinos to be initiated by Galatis.

Arriving at Bucharest as the new Russian consul, Alexander Pini reputedly enjoyed a steady friendship with the Prince, much to Manuc's chagrin. The latter died unexpectedly at Hîncești on 20 June, which "must have filled with joy Prince Caradja's soul". Meanwhile, the Sultan considered ending the affair with a violent coup in Bucharest. Merișescu reports being tipped off that "your prince has not paid his haraç these past five years, and the Turks are preparing to have him slashed". Moreover, the Ottoman court had been made aware that Caradja was in contact with the Eteria, and that this intrigue was being facilitated by Russian diplomats in Wallachia. At some point in 1818, Caradja and Callimachi's delegates met with Emperor Alexander and his ministers in Kishinev, urging them to invade the Principalities. Kapodistrias told them off, since "Russia's desire is to conserve peace with the Porte, at any cost". Caradja himself caught up with rumors that he had been disgraced at the Ottoman court; he also discovered that his Soutzos son-in-law, who wanted the throne of Moldavia, now supported the toppling of both Princes. In retaliation, he sacked and humiliated Michael's father, Gregory Soutzos, from his postings at the Bucharest court. On 28 September 1818 (New Style: 10 October), he convened the Princely Divan and asked them to form a regency council while he absented Bucharest "for reasons he did not care to disclose to them."

=== Later life ===
==== Escape from Wallachia ====
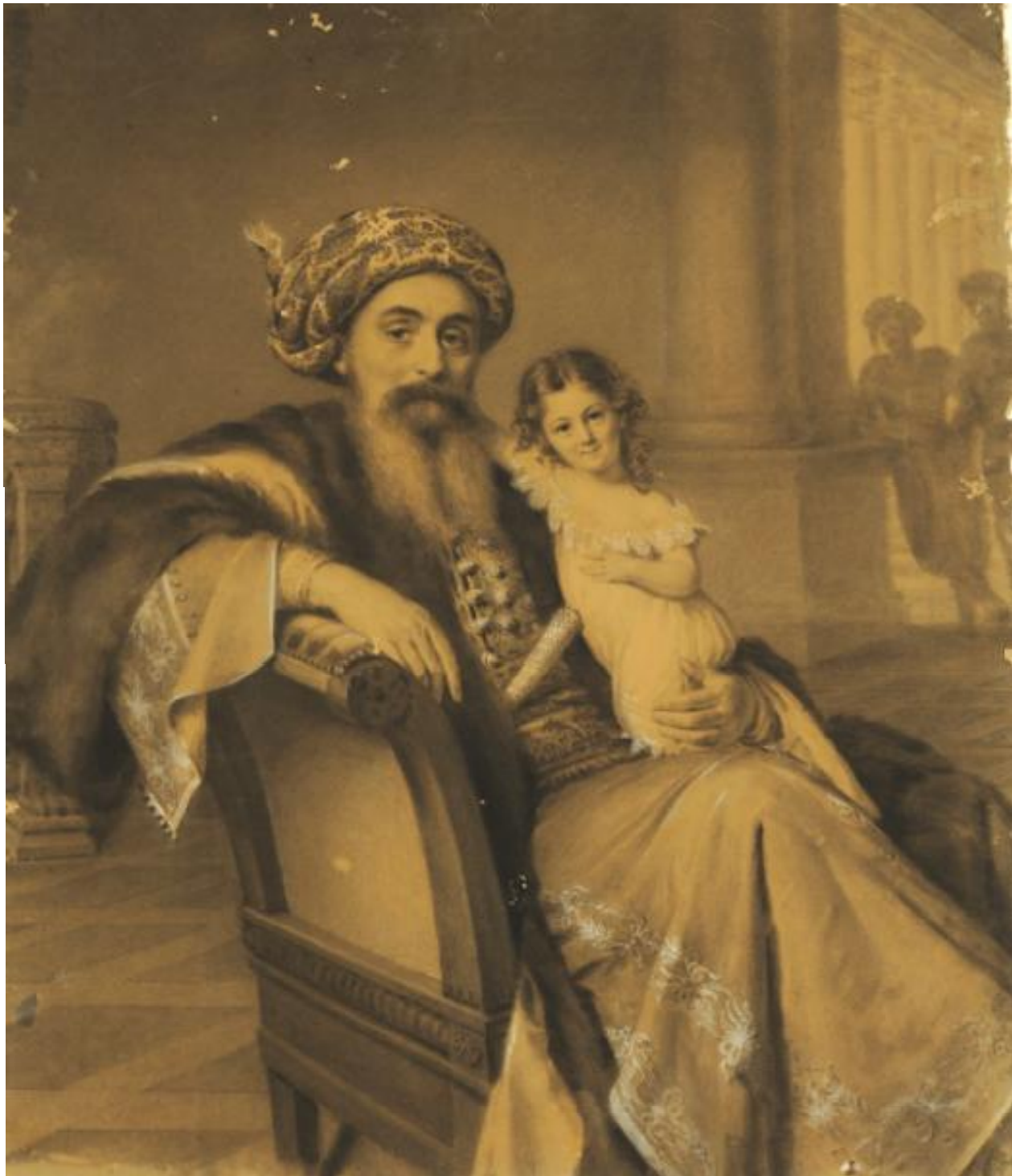
Double portrait of Caradja and granddaughter Eleni Argyropoulos in exile

On the evening of 29 September (11 October) 1818, after having attended the funeral ceremony of Ban Radu Golescu, Caradja took his family on a what appeared to be a leisurely carriage trip outside Bucharest. Instead, they fled for the Transylvanian city of Kronstadt, alongside 300 of their Arnaut guard. According to a period testimony by the Russian agent Pavel Liprandi, they narrowly escaped Pandur retribution: Vladimirescu wanted to ambush the princely caravan as it entered Transylvania; however, his plan was foiled by Olympios, who, instead of helping with the ambush, escorted Caradja to safety. Pini also allegedly played a part, having "received great sums of money to facilitate this escape." The Caradjas' drive into Austria required tacit consent from Metternich, who granted them asylum, as well as the use of forged papers. The Prince allegedly asked both Austria and Russia for a resident's permit. Metternich refused to "compromise [Austria] in front of the Sublime Porte", while Emperor Alexander only responded that he needed time to reflect on the issue.

The convoy then set off for in the restored Swiss Confederation. On 29 November 1818, they passed through Lausanne, with the local Gazette informing that Caradja had with him some 15 servants an armed guard, and probably 50 million piasters as bounty. He and his relatives stayed at Geneva for the following six months, though one of the locals, botanist Augustin Pyramus de Candolle, recalled in 1862 that they spent an entire year in the city. The same memoirist was intrigued and amused by Caradja's family, noting the Princess Eleni was obese, that Beizadea Konstantinos was highly incompetent, and that Rallou, though stylish, was unable to carry a conversation—as noted by historian Andrei Pippidi, the latter claim is especially doubtful. Lady Morgan, who dined with the Caradjas in March 1819, writes that they were "all in their national dresses, glittering in the sun with gold and jewels; and the personal beauty of all, especially of the men, was most striking." Prince John, who appeared in a gown of "white and gold tissue" and spoke French "beautifully", struck Morgan as a "sensible, agreeable man, remarkably handsome, and a good dash of the coxcomb."

Alexandros Mavrokordatos had also joined this "Phanariote colony", but seemed to snub his liege: "One would be hard pressed to find in Europe a minister who would speak [like Mavrokordatos did] in front of their sovereign". Candolle describes Caradja himself as able to converse in French, but "less informed of European mores than various members of his family"; perplexing locals with his suspicion of Swiss banks in a Swiss city, and with his unwillingness to cut down on luxuries, he began selling his silver on the open market. He was also able to recover and sell off his jewels, which were handled by Jean-François Bautte. According to historian Bogdan Bucur, while in exile Caradja "lived off his huge fortune, which consoled him regarding his prudent abdication." Most funds had been transferred into Western banks (some 30 million piasters were moved by the Geymüller House to the National Austrian Bank). The Geymüller reserve became accessible to Caradja once he relocated to a new home in the Grand Duchy of Tuscany, at Pisa. He enjoyed an unusually deep level of protection from the Tuscan authorities, with censors intervening to remove all criticism of Caradja from the local newspapers.

Caradja's escape was seen as intolerable by Mahmud II; while the aged Alexandros Soutzos took over as Prince, the Sultan issued a decree that only four clans of Phanariotes, including two branches of the Soutzos, could ever expect to have members appointed to high office. On 12 October 1818, the Ottoman Shaykh al-Islām, Çerkes Halil Efendi, argued before Mahmud that Halet had forced Caradja to flee, by asking him to perform acts he defined as mugâyir-i rızâ-yı 'âli ("against the Sultan's consent"). As reported by Lady Morgan, "The Prince Caradja was a victim of the recent intrigues of the Ottoman Court [...]. His people surrounded and put to death the messengers of his doom, while the Hospodar fled with his family to the frontiers." Halet was "seriously reprimanded" and lost the Sultan's favor, though his candidate, Michael Soutzos, was still a favorite for the Moldavian crown; Beizadea Georgios, whom the events had caught in Istanbul, implored the Sultan for clemency, and received a hatt-i humayun granting him personal safety. The Caradja estates in Istanbul, including those owned by the Kapucu, were confiscated. Meanwhile, Ciorogârla Domnească was auctioned off to cover some of the budgetary losses created by its owner's departure. It was purchased by Constantin Varlaam for 750,000 thalers.

As remembered by Dăscălescu, Caradja's disappearance "once he had absorbed enough bounties" was not followed by "any sort of troubles in the country". In reality, the vacancy led to diplomatic conflicts and to a lasting political uncertainty: Strogonov made the case that, as per the international treaties in place, the Ottomans needed to establish Caradja's guilt before finding him a replacement. Caradja left an explanatory letter that reached the Grand Vizier Burdulu Pasha, who showed it to Strogonov in January 1819. In it, the Prince argued that he had been left with no choice but to flee. Strogonov still declared himself upset by the Soutzos appointments, and, in March, considered asking Caradja to present his version of the events before Emperor Alexander, in Saint Petersburg. During those months, Olympios was preparing the grounds for an anti-Ottoman rebellion, informing Panagiotis Anagnostopoulos that he commanded the allegiance of some 300 Serb and Bulgarian volunteers. Caradja's flight also deepened conflicts between Romanian nationalists and Phanariotes: immediately after, a delegation of boyars unsuccessfully demanded that all boyar dignities be assigned to men who could prove their Romanian background, and that Caradja's native enemy, Brâncoveanu, be recognized as Prince. The Divan met in December 1818 to vote on Metropolitan Nectarie's destitution and the expulsion of non-princely Phanariote families. A 20-man majority was gathered in favor of the latter measure, and pressures were put on Nectarie, who eventually resigned.

==== Revolutionary sponsor and retiree ====
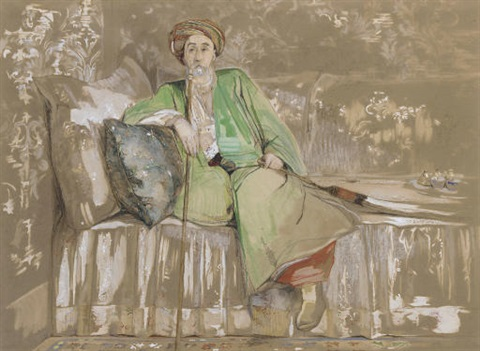
Caradja reclining on a divan (1825 painting by John Frederick Lewis)

Within years of this protest, Wallachia, Moldavia and Ottoman Greece became central to the anti-Ottoman Greek revolution. During its early stages, Michael and Roxani Soutzos, now the princely couple of Moldavia, called on Caradja to meet them in Bessarabia or Moldavia, arguing that the Eteria had all but succeeded there. Caradja had still not reconciled with Michael during his time in Geneva; he probably never intended to follow up on this invitation, but in any case he would have been prevented to do so by the Austrian authorities, who issued orders to stop him at the border. Instead, he financed the nationalist and Philhellene movement, forming a war aid society in Tuscany, funding Jean-Gabriel Eynard's similar venture in Geneva, and sending regular gifts to fighters such as Georgios Karaiskakis, Theodoros Kolokotronis, and Andreas Miaoulis. On 14 March 1821, Beizadea Georgios took his family out of Istanbul, narrowly escaping the anti-Greek massacre and reaching the Russian port of Odessa in April. His brother Konstantinos was one of the few Wallachian Phanariotes to join in the fighting, sailing to Morea Eyalet alongside the Moldavian Teodor Negri. Once there, he united his efforts with his Mavrokordatos cousin, who also represented Prince John and the Pisans.

As noted by Hellenist Nestor Camariano, Prince John's residence in Pisa was "not unlike France's famous salons", counting Lord Byron and Percy Bysshe Shelley among its celebrity guests. A contemporary account by a Wallachian known only as Popovici alleges that the former monarch and his associate Kapodistrias also ran a Masonic Lodge. Their association allegedly sponsored not only Greek agitation, but also the parallel Wallachian uprising of 1821, which saw Vladimirescu briefly taking power as Wallachia's governor. The movement for Greek emancipation was indeed supported financially by the former Prince, whom some Pisan Greeks wished to see emerging as a political leader of liberated Greece. On 9 January 1822, the Greek rebels of the Peloponnese, organized as the Peloponnesian Senate, opted for a Phanariote monarchy, and elected themselves a 12-member regency council ("Greek Central Government"). Caradja was appointed its chairman, and Michael Soutzos its vice-chairman, with a boat being sent in to pick them up from Pisa. This plan did not fall through, though Mavrokordatos went on to serve as revolutionary leader for a brief interval.

The Caradjas' party was defeated by Demetrios Ypsilantis and the Eterists during the First National Assembly of Epidaurus, which was attended in person by John and by Beizadea Konstantinos. Both were indignant at the outcome, and opted to return to Pisa, where they remained until the revolution could fully succeed. The Prince himself endorsed Kapodistrias. Emerging as Greece's governor in 1827, he was granted 50,000 francs by Caradja. The latter continued to supervise political affairs through Mavrokordatos. In a letter from 1826, he speaks about "my unfortunate son-in-law Michalakis [Soutzos]", highlighting "his arrogance and his complete stupidity", and warning his own partisans that Soutzos wanted to take over as ruler of Greece, with help from Lord Cochrane. Caradja's description of this plan includes the first-ever recorded usage of "Quixotism" (Δονκιχωτισμός) in the Greek language.

During his final decades, Caradja was politically and culturally loyal to the Greek state—and "the first of many Phanariot[e]s [...] to settle in Greece." In late 1829, he was living in that state's capital of Nafplio, where his palace was visited by archeologist Richard Burgess. According to the latter, he surrounded himself with "civilized" Philhellenes and habitually wore an "Ancient Greek costume". In Wallachia, the Greek and Romanian uprisings ended with the enthronement of Grigore D. Ghica; during this reign, Brâncoveanu allied himself with Vlahutzi, allegedly contributing to an 1826 revolt in Mehedinți County. Three years later, the circumstances of another Russo-Turkish War brought Wallachia and Moldavia into the Russian orbit, and established a new constitutional regime, Regulamentul Organic. It came with additional requirements for the peasant population, leading those of Măgureni to ask that they be allowed to pay only duties established under "Caradja's law".

Caradja finally settled in Athens in 1830, before the country transformed into a "Kingdom of Greece". In May 1833, just weeks after the last Ottoman troops withdrew from the city, he welcomed in his home Otto of Wittelsbach, the first Greek king, on what was Otto's first trip to Athens. Archeologist Ludwig Ross recalls that the aging former Prince, who shared his home with Vlahutzi, made few public appearances—including one for Otto's second visit, in December 1834, when he rode a horse and wore an "imposing attire". As Ross notes, he was living on a much-reduced allowance, with Panagiotis Soutsos adding that he now favored "solitude" and "full equality" with his fellow citizens. Caradja's Goldoni translations saw print in two editions: the first one came out at Nafplio in 1834; the second one in Athens four years later. A report by publicist Gábor Kazinczy claims that, by 1837, he had also translated and published Paul et Virginie—though this account was since placed in doubt. According to Camariano, if Caradja ever translated from Bernardin de Saint-Pierre, he never published the result.

Caradja's involvement with the development of modern Greek theater continued into the early 1840s, when he helped his daughter's friend Costache Aristia set up the Philodramatic Society of Athens. According to a report by A. Bouchon, the Phanariote Princes found themselves shunned by the egalitarian Athenians. For this reason, Bouchon argues, Rallou married the commoner Konstantinos Kolokotronis. This is corrected in other accounts, which note that Kolokotronis' wife was not Prince John's daughter, but rather that of his son Georgios. The Prince himself spent his final years battling asthma, which almost killed him in 1843; he remained active, and during these final months, was spotted on a visit to the Temple of Olympian Zeus. He finally died of the disease, in Athens, on the morning of 27 December 1844. This event overlapped with the National Assembly of Greeks, and his funeral had to be postponed for two days, allowing deputies to participate in both events. The service was held at Saint Irene Church, with funeral orations delivered by P. Soutsos and an Archimandrite of Greek Orthodoxy, C. M. Apostolidis. Caradja's body was then buried in Saint George Church of Kolokynthou, which had been built under his patronage.

== Legacy ==
=== "Great predator" and cultural patron ===
Historian Paul Cernovodeanu provides an overview of Caradja's political legacy: he notes that, unlike his uncle Nicholas, who enjoyed a sound reputation in Wallachian literary sources, John was vilified and cursed as the "great predator". This image was codified first by Dionisie Eclesiarhul, and later by Ion Ghica. Romanian folklore had coined the saying "thefts as in Karadzas' time" (Patrinelis' rendition). This depiction is also found in pamphlets put out by several Wallachian boyars, including an 1818 piece by Iordache Golescu, advertised as "published at the expense of those who are still left with some money". In 1959, critic Radu Albala revisited Golescu's account, noting: "its details on the savage taxation and exploitation [by Caradja] are funny in that bitter way, their humor thick as well as irresistible." A similar work, tentatively attributed to Naum Râmniceanu, inflamed passions by suggesting that Caradja and Ștefan Bellu wanted to set up a "New Greece" in Wallachia, which required them to decimate the boyar population. Unusually, a hill called Karadjaua or Carageaua is found outside Sănduleni in Western Moldavia. The claim that it commemorates Prince John was seen as baseless by Constantin Jean Karadja.

Patrinelis suggests that John Caradja's Romanian reputation was deserved, since Caradja, arriving to Wallachia at the peak of "administrative turpitude", "surpassed all his confrères in avarice". Ionașcu argues that he was overall a "vulgar spirit" with "reactionary" ideas, who could only garner praise from Friedrich von Gentz, and only in exchange for money. Another author, Radu Economu, contrarily finds that "for all his negative traits (greed, thirst for money) which resulted in his sad reputation, [Caradja] was a prince of high culture". Similarly, cultural historian Alkis Angelou argues that Caradja was "one of the three gifted and especially cultured Phanariote rulers", with the other two being the inaugural Phanariote Nicholas Mavrocordatos and the mid-18th-century Grigore III Ghica. In 1814, Stephanos Partzoulas dedicated his pioneering textbook of French grammar to Caradja and Nectarie. Daniel Philippidis, who taught for a while at the princely academy, praised the Bucharest court of 1816 as a "true refuge of Hellenism". However, he later grew dissatisfied with the quality of teaching, and emigrated to Moldavia. Later dedications to the Prince include one by novelist Grigorios Palaiologos, appearing on both volumes of his O Polypathis (1839).

Scholar Walter Puchner notes that Caradja's translations were important cultural landmarks, for completing "the first phase of Goldoni's reception in Greece, under the auspices of the Enlightenment", but also that they were never used for actual stage productions. Puchner himself discovered and in the library of Zosimaia School Caradja's "excellent" versions of Demofonte and the other verse works, which he prepared for publication in 2014. Instead, Caradja had a lasting association with historical events central to the development of Romanian theater, and, more generically, national literature. Immediately after Rallou's escape to Transylvania, Iancu Văcărescu took over Cișmeaua Roșie for a "micro-season", showing the first-ever stage performances in Romanian, with Ion Heliade Rădulescu as one of the performers. Cișmeaua existed as an independent theatrical venue until being destroyed in an 1825 fire.

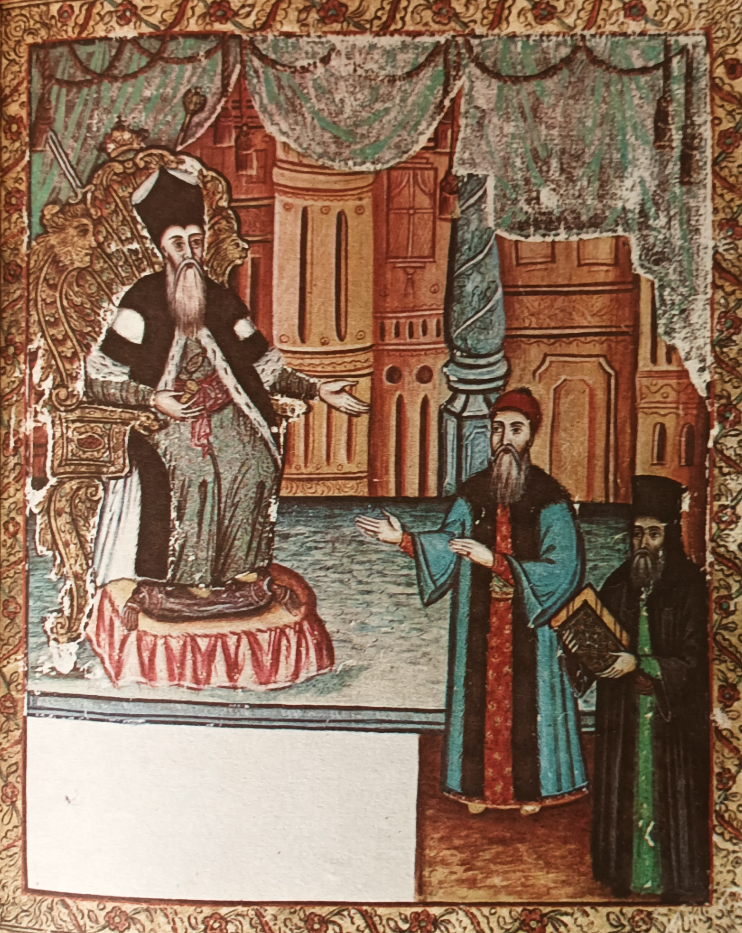
Caradja receiving the Cotroceni Monastery ledger (1817 illustration attributed to Dionisie Eclesiarhul)

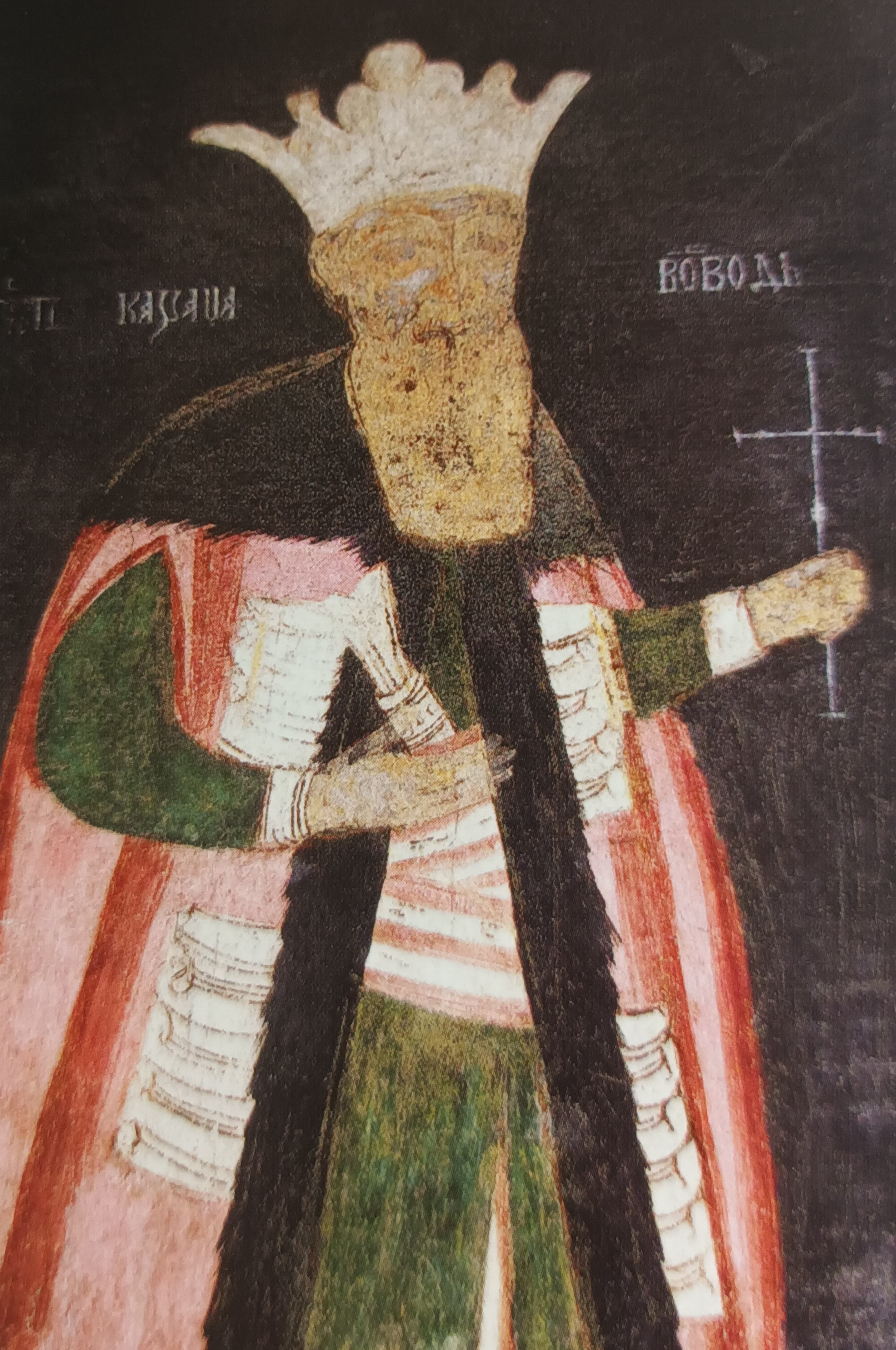
Caradja's votive portrait at Lainici Monastery (1818)

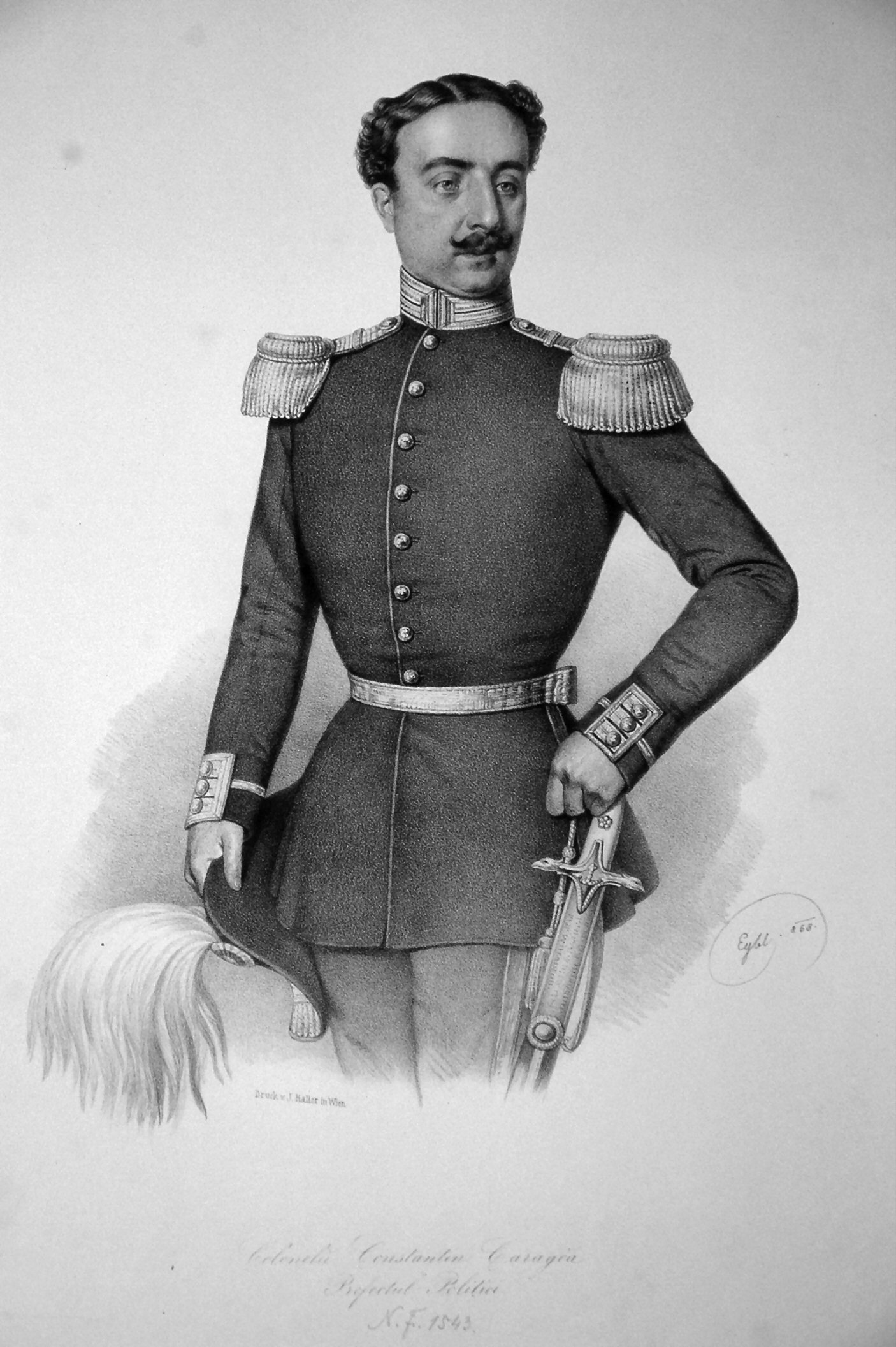
Beizadea Konstantinos in 1858, by Franz Eybl

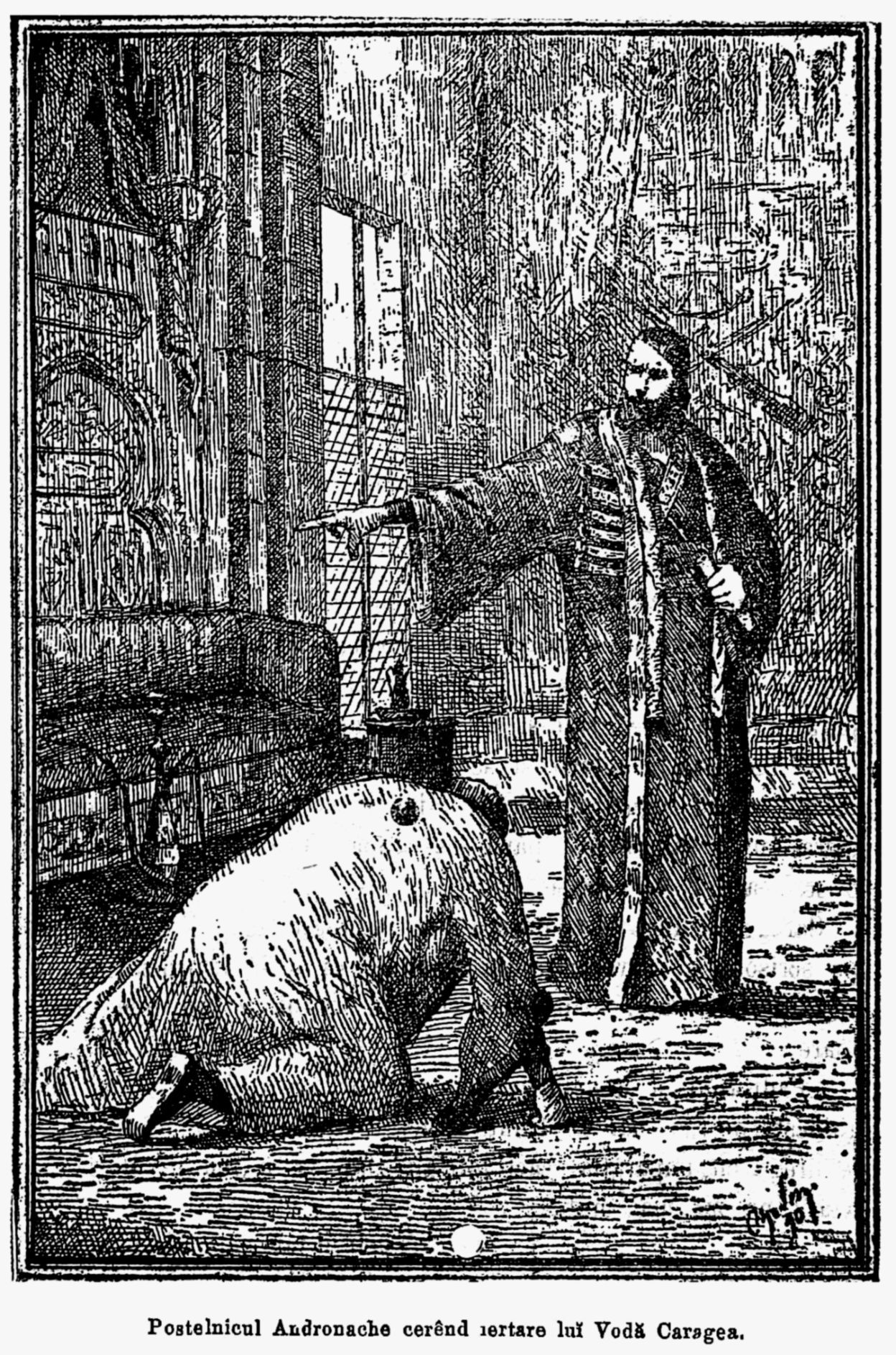
"Postelnic Andronache begging Prince Caradja for forgiveness". Scene from Nicolae Filimon's Ciocoii vechi și noi, as illustrated by Mihail Simonidi

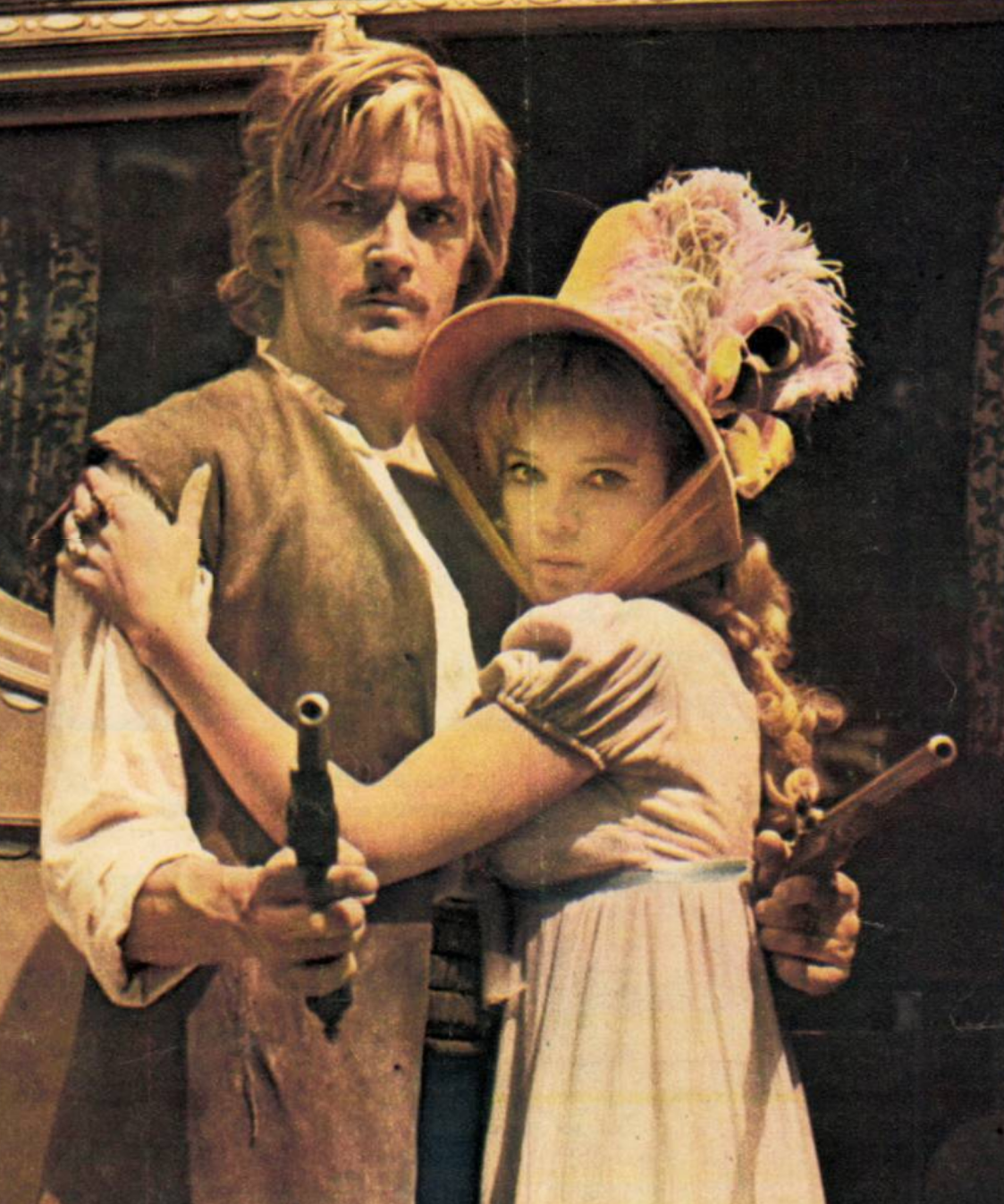
Aimée Iacobescu as Rallou Karatza, hugging Florin Piersic during filming for Haiducii lui Șaptecai (photograph by A. Mihailopol)

Caradja honored Wallachia's Orthodox tradition by allowing himself to appear in frescoes, including at Saints Nicholas and Andrew Church in Târgu Jiu (1812) and Lainici Monastery (1818). Both paintings show him almost touching a khanjar dagger, and wearing an anachronistic Eastern crown. A miniature of the Prince appears in the chronicle of Cotroceni Monastery, and was seen by art historian Vasile Georgescu Paleolog as a likely work by Dionisie Eclesiarhul (done in his official capacity as church calligrapher). As a patron of high art in the Western fashion, Caradja stood out for sponsoring Mihail Töpler, who became his official portraitist; one of the Töpler works is also reproduced for the first edition of Legiuirea, in an engraving done by Blasius Höpfel.

This Viennese version of the code is in Modern Greek, and was arranged for print by poet Athanasios Christopoulos; the Romanian-language edition, completed later in 1818, was unusually printed at Kronstadt rather than Bucharest. The Christopoulos–Höpfel edition, one copy of which was donated by Caradja himself to the Bodleian Library, is also noted for featuring the coat of arms of Wallachia combined with heraldic unicorns from Prince John's family arms (the first local example of a practice borrowed from Western European traditions). Its Romanian successor is instead decorated with the respective symbols of "faith, hope, love, and knowledge: the anchor overlaying the cross, the open book, [...] and inside the book a heart that gives rise to a flame." In both versions, and in other contexts, Caradja made ample use of a seal which showed Wallachian arms alongside the local symbols of all 17 counties, as first introduced during his uncle's short reign.

=== Posterity ===
Athens' National Historical Museum preserves an anonymous drawing showing Caradja, in his Pisan period, with Eleni Argyropoulos, his young granddaughter. Her mother Rallou died in 1870 at Thonberg, in the Kingdom of Saxony, two years after her sister Roxani; by then, Eleni had married Baron de Rouen, who served as France's Ambassador in Greece. Two Caradja or Karatzas branches have emerged from John's two sons. Konstantinos turned to support the Ottoman Empire, serving as its Ambassador to Holland, where he died in 1860; the same position was later filled by his son, Jean Karadja Pasha. His descendants continued to reside in Wallachia and the successor Kingdom of Romania. They produced Jean Pasha's half-Swedish son, Constantin Jean, who, in his parallel work as a historian, published and prefaced the Caradja–Kapodistrias correspondence in 1921. He also argued for using "Karadja" as the family surname, noting that the Romanianized "Caragea" no longer showed its origins. Georgios' line was continued by his son Aristides (1830–1890), who served on the Supreme Court of Greece. It includes another Georgios Karatzas, who was the Greek Ambassador to Switzerland. Through his daughter Smaragda, the Prince had grandson Spyridon Mavrogenis, the medical scholar, and great-grandson Alexandros Mavrogenis, who was Ottoman Ambassador to the United States.

Legiuirea was also part of Caradja's enduring legacy in Wallachia. Editions of it were co-sponsored by an Aromanian physician and bibliophile, Constantin Caracaș. It remained in use under the Regulamentul regime, which only completed its civil-law provisions, but was finally nullified under the Civil Code of Romania. Its lengthy survival angered Wallachia's radical liberals: in 1851, the exile Cezar Bolliac prophesied that Legiuirea would end up being publicly burned. Looking back on the Phanariote period in the early 1900s, Beizadea George Barbu Știrbei argued that Legiuirea had only served to "abide by the obscurity" which allowed Princes to act as they pleased.

Other than supporting his daughter, Caradja had an indirect contribution to Romanian literary culture by bringing with him to Bucharest a Greek immigrant cook, who was the ancestor of Costache and Ion Luca Caragiale. The Prince's own appearance as a "deus ex machina" in Iancu Jianu's story was first exploited in an 1857 melodrama by Matei Millo and Ion Anestin, which, from 1868, became the basis of a novel by N. D. Popescu-Popnedea. His overall association with theatrical development was celebrated by novelist Nicolae Filimon, who argued that his showcasing of plays in Greek served to cultivate the "primitive people" of Wallachia. Filimon's 1862 novel, Ciocoii vechi și noi ("Upstarts Old and New"), "may be read—if prudently so—as a chronicle of the Caradja era", including a topographical record of his court. The same work takes a sympathetic view of Prince John. He is attributed an anti-Ottoman speech which places blame for the country's destitution entirely on the Porte—and which reflects Filimon's own conception of Phanariote politics.

A character based on Caradja was introduced to Romanian cinema in 1928, when Horia Igiroșanu completed his film project, Iancu Jianu. His reign was revisited indirectly, in a fictionalized form, by Mateiu Caragiale in his 1929 novel Craii de Curtea-Veche. In 1937, Mircea Eliade announced that he was working on a play about Princess Rallou and the 1813 plague, but ultimately abandoned this project. One of the later literary works taking inspiration from Caradja's reign is Marin Iorda's play Cîntec de inimă albastră ("Singing the Blues")—written in 1940, but first performed only in 1967. The period was a core subject in Pasărea de foc ("Fire Bird"), a 1954 collection of stories by Eusebiu Camilar.

The Prince and Rallou were also portrayed by Stere Popescu and Cora Benador, respectively, in the Iancu Jianu ballet, created by Oleg Danovski in 1964. A heavily fictionalized Phanariote rule, with elements from both Caradja's historical reign and Filimon's interpretation of it, forms the narrative matter in Eugen Barbu's 1970 novel, Princepele. Caradja's reign is also the backdrop for the Dinu Cocea's adventure-comedy films, Haiducii lui Șaptecai and Zestrea domniței Ralu (both released in 1971). Nucu Păunescu appears as Prince John, with Aimée Iacobescu as Rallou. By 1973, Alexandru Mitru and Aurel Tita had created a Iancu Jianu children's play, with ample depictions of Caradja and his court.

== Notes ==
Preceded by Alexander Hangerli	Grand Dragoman of the Porte; 1807–1808	Succeeded by John N. Caradja
Preceded by Panagiotis Moutouzis	Grand Dragoman of the Porte; 1812	Succeeded by Iakovos Argyropoulos
Preceded by Constantine Ypsilantis	Prince of Wallachia; 1812–1818	Succeeded by Alexandros Soutzos
