= Ipermestra =

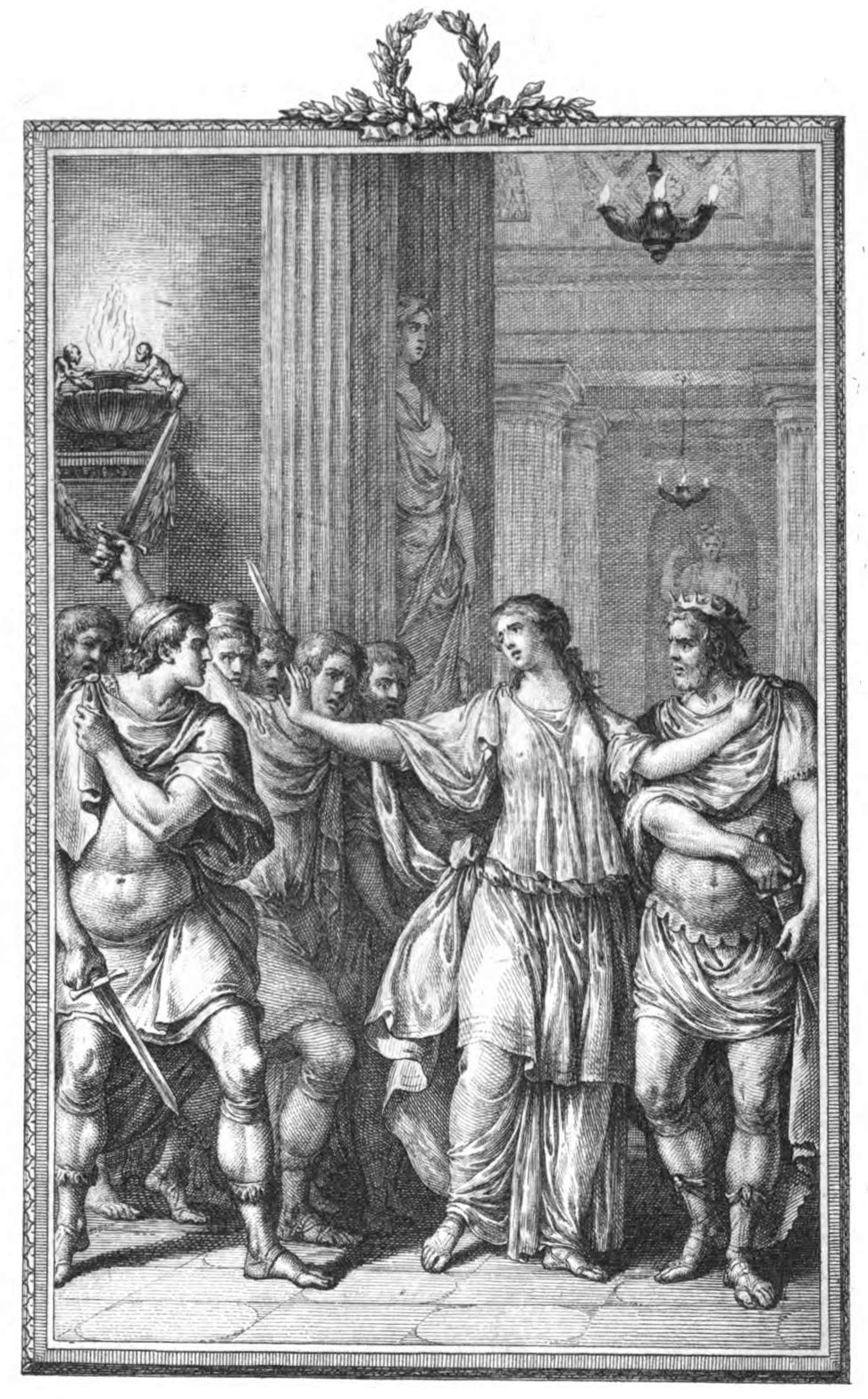
Metastasio - Ipermestra, Act III, Scene IX. "Let the tyrant die, let him die!" – Ipermestra: "Wicked men, stop!"

Ipermestra is an opera libretto by Pietro Metastasio first set by Johann Adolph Hasse 8 January 1744, and in the November of the same year by Christoff Willibald Gluck.

== Plot ==
The story is based on that of Hypermnestra (Ὑπερμνήστρα) in Greek mythology, the daughter of Danaus and the ancestor of the Danaids. The story had already been the theme of earlier operas including Hipermestra, by Francesco Cavalli 1658, and operas Ipermestra by Geminiano Giacomelli 1724, Antonio Vivaldi (1728 lost), Francesco Feo 1736, Giovanni Battista Ferrandini 1741, Rinaldo da Capua 1744.

== Settings of Metastasio's libretto ==
- Ipermestra (Hasse), opera by Johann Adolf Hasse, Jan. 1744
- Ipermestra (Gluck), opera by Christoff Willibald Gluck, Nov. 1744 - Aria "Non hai cor per un'impresa" recorded by Daniel Behle, Armonia Atenea and George Petrou
- Ipermestra, opera by Egidio Duni Teatro Falcone, Genoa 1748
- Ipermestra, opera by Ferdinando Bertoni Teatro San Samuele, Venice 1749
- Ipermestra, opera by Niccolò Jommelli Spoleto, 1751
- Ipermestra, opera by Pasquale Cafaro, first setting, Naples 1751
- Ipermestra, opera by Andrea Adolfati 1752, Modena
- Ipermestra, opera by Davide Perez 1754, Lisbon
- Ipermestra, opera by Giuseppe Re 1755, Teatro Solerio Alessandria
- Ipermestra, opera by Baldassare Galuppi 1758, Teatro Regio Ducale Milan
- Ipermestra, opera by Ignazio Fiorillo 1759, Braunschweig
- Ipermestra, opera by Johann Ernst Eberlin 1761, Salzburg
- Ipermestra, opera by Pasquale Cafaro 1761 second setting, Teatro San Carlo, Naples - an aria "Gonfio tu vedi il fiume" recorded by Franco Fagioli for the recital Arias for Caffarelli
- Ipermestra, opera by Giuseppe Sarti 1766, Teatro Argentina, Rome, then 1797 King’s Theatre, Haymarket, London
- Ipermestra, opera by Gian Francesco de Majo, 1768 Teatro San Carlo, Naples - to date the only recording of a setting of the libretto made in 1963 by RAI conducted by it:Armando La Rosa Parodi. Cast included Emilia Cundari (Ipermestra), Franco Ventriglia (Danao), Herbert Handt (Linceo), Bianca Maria Casoni (Elpince), Mario Boriello (Plistene), Robert El Haage (Adrasto).
- Ipermestra, opera by Josef Mysliveček 1769, Teatro della Pergola, Florence
- Ipermestra, opera by Niccolò Piccinni 1772, Teatro San Carlo, Naples
- Ipermestra, opera by Gian Francesco Fortunati 1773, Teatro di Corte, Modena
- Ipermestra, opera by Johann Gottlieb Naumann 1774, Teatro San Benedetto, Venice
- Ipermestra, opera by Raimondo Mei 1778, Teatro Prini, Pavia
- Ipermestra, opera by Vicente Martín y Soler, 1780, Teatro San Carlo, Naples
- Ipermestra, opera by Salvatore Rispoli 1785, Teatro alla Scala, Milan
- Ipermestra, opera by Gennaro Astarita 1789, Teatro San Benedetto, Venice
- Ipermestra, opera by Giovanni Paisiello 1791, Teatro Nuovo, Padua
- Ipermestra, opera by Francesco Morlacchi 1810, Teatro Argentina, Rome
- Ipermestra, second opera by Saverio Mercadante 1827, Teatro de São Carlos Lisbon on the libretto by Metastasio - Mercadante had previously set another Ipermestra 1825, Teatro San Carlo, Naples, on a libretto by Luigi Ricciuti
- Ipermestra, opera by Baltasar Saldoni 1838, Teatro del la Cruz, Madrid
- Ipermestra, opera by Ramón Carnicer 1843, Liceo, Saragossa
