= Fortunati =

Fortunati is an Italian surname. Notable people with the surname include:

- Gian Francesco Fortunati
- José Fortunati (born 1955), Brazilian lawyer and politician
- Leopoldina Fortunati (fl. 1996–present), Italian feminist, theorist, and writer
- Michael Fortunati
