= Caragea's plague =

1813–14 bubonic plague epidemic in Wallachia

Caragea's plague (Romanian: Ciuma lui Caragea) was a bubonic plague epidemic that occurred in Wallachia, mainly in Bucharest, in the years 1813 and 1814. It coincided with the rule of the Phanariote Prince Ioan Caragea.

The outbreak in Bucharest started in April 1813, but there were no recorded deaths until June. A quarantine was established, the city gates of Bucharest were closed, and guards were placed to prevent anyone from entering the city without permission. The foreigners and non-residents were expelled from the city, and the city's beggars were relocated to monasteries beyond the city's walls. Within the city, public meetings in pubs and coffee shops were forbidden. Alcohol sales were only allowed for domestic use. To avoid the formation of crowds, markets and schools were closed down, and the prisoners in the debtors' prison were set free.

Bucharest hired additional gravediggers to create mass graves. By October 1813, there were not enough gravediggers to bury all the dead. Several bodies were left out in the open, where they were eaten by the local dogs and other urban animals. By January or February 1814, there were fewer deaths. People who had fled the city were soon able to return. However, two of the quarantine hospitals established during the epidemic remained in operation until 1818. By estimates of the era, there were between 20,000 and 30,000 deaths in Bucharest during the years of the epidemic.

== Alleged source ==
The plague was expected and in January 1813, Caragea founded two quarantine hospitals, one in Teleorman and one in Giurgiu County.

== Outbreak and measures taken ==
There were reports of people with the plague on the streets of Bucharest as early as April 1813, but the first death attributed to bubonic plague was on 11 June in Văcărești. Quarantine was established, the gates of the city of Bucharest were closed and all the roads from Văcăreşti to Dealul Spirii were guarded to prevent anyone from entering the city without permission.

Government clerks and priests had to check each house for plague-infected people, all the foreigners and non-residents were expelled from the city, and the beggars were sent to monasteries outside Bucharest. The money which came from the counties where the plague was spread (Ilfov, Vlaşca, Teleorman and Olt) had to be washed in vinegar and the number of gravediggers was increased to 60.

In spite of that, the plague continued to spread, mostly due to lack of qualified medical care. The July 1813 register books of the Wallachian government show that most of the decrees were related to the plague. Among the restrictions, meetings in pubs and coffee shops were forbidden and alcohol was being sold only for home consumption. The people who died had a simple burial with no attendants. The people who hid sick people or the peddlers ("both Jewish and Christians") were expelled from the city and their belongings were burnt. In August, due to the spread of the plague, the request to allow people to flee the city was approved, Caragea asking the ispravnics to take care to avoid contact with the villagers. To avoid crowds, markets and schools were closed down, most judicial proceedings were stopped, and the people in the debtors' prison were freed.

Many of the new rules were not respected, despite the rulers' attempts, which included the spread of printed fliers. By August, the city became almost deserted, with even the doctors fleeing, as did Caragea, who moved his residence outside Bucharest to Cotroceni. The French consul said that two-thirds of the Bucharesters fled.

People with immunity to the disease were hired as undertakers, and walked from door to door to gather corpses. The corpses were taken to the mass graves in Dudeşti and buried there. Often, dying people were taken also and buried alive, and sometimes beaten to death. An undertaker squad once reported that "we collected 15 dead today, but only buried 14, because one of them ran away". Sometimes, sick people with enough strength fought back, and killed the undertakers.

The highest mortality was in October 1813; the gravediggers couldn't even bury all the dead, and many of them were put in large pits, which were not covered and many "were eaten by dogs and other beasts". In February 1814, the last market still open, Târgul de Afară (Obor), was closed down, but soon the people returned to the city. In 1818 the quarantine hospitals of Plumbuita and Văcărești were closed down.

== Death toll ==
An estimated 60,000 people died of the plague in the two years, 20–30,000 of them in Bucharest, which is a large number, as the city population at the time was about 120,000. According to a church teacher, the church reports say that 20,000 died in Bucharest by January 1814 (excluding those buried in backyards), while the personal doctor of Caragea claimed that between 25,000 and 30,000 died.

== See also ==
- 1812–19 Ottoman plague epidemic
