= Nicolae Filimon =

Romanian novelist and short-story writer (1819–1865)

Nicolae Filimon

Nicolae Filimon (Romanian pronunciation: [nikoˈla.e filiˈmon]; 6 September 1819 – 19 March 1865) was a Wallachian Romanian novelist and short-story writer, remembered as the author of the first Realist novel in Romanian literature, Ciocoii vechi şi noi ("The Old and the New Parvenus"), which was centered on the self-seeking figure Dinu Păturică (who drew comparisons with Stendhal's Julien Sorel). He was also a noted travel writer, folklorist, musician, and the first musical critic in his country.

== Biography ==
Born in Bucharest as the son of an Eastern Orthodox parish priest of the Enei Church, Filimon was a cantor and an autodidact. According to Ion Ghica's Letters, he was briefly employed by theater companies after his father's death in 1830, singing in a theater choir and playing the flute.

In 1852, he was chosen administrator of the Enei Church, remaining in office until his death. The same year, he became a minor public official at the Faith Department in Prince Barbu Dimitrie Ştirbei's Chancellery.

In late 1857, Filimon made his literary debut with pieces written for the Naţionalul newspaper. During the following year, he travelled to the German Confederation, and published his account as Excursiuni în Germania meridională ("Voyages to Southern Germany"), which also included the Romanticist novellas Mănăstirea domenicanilor după colina Fiesole (later known as Mateo Cipriani) and O baroneasă de poronceală. His experience and relative success as a journalist and critic would serve as the basis of chapters in his novels, which actually form in-depth analyses of cultural trends; he would collaborate on journals edited by Cezar Bolliac and Ion Ionescu de la Brad.

During the period, he also published Nenorocirile unui slujnicar sau gentilomii de mahala ("The Misfortunes of a Servant or The Gentlemen on the Outskirts"; 1861), a rather typical depiction of servants and their lives, as well as his first collected fairy tales - Omul de flori cu barba de mătasă sau povestea lui Făt-Frumos ("The Flower Man with Silky Beard or The Tale of Făt-Frumos") and Omul de piatră ("The Man of Stone").

Ciocoii vechi şi noi, a novel about John Caradja, was written in 1862, and published as a volume in 1863. It became an instant success, but Filimon could not enjoy it for long after: although he continued to write for various journals, he was stricken down with tuberculosis, and died soon after.
