= St. Nicholas in-a-Day Church =

Heritage site in Bucharest, Romania

Coordinates: 44°26′13″N 26°05′57″E

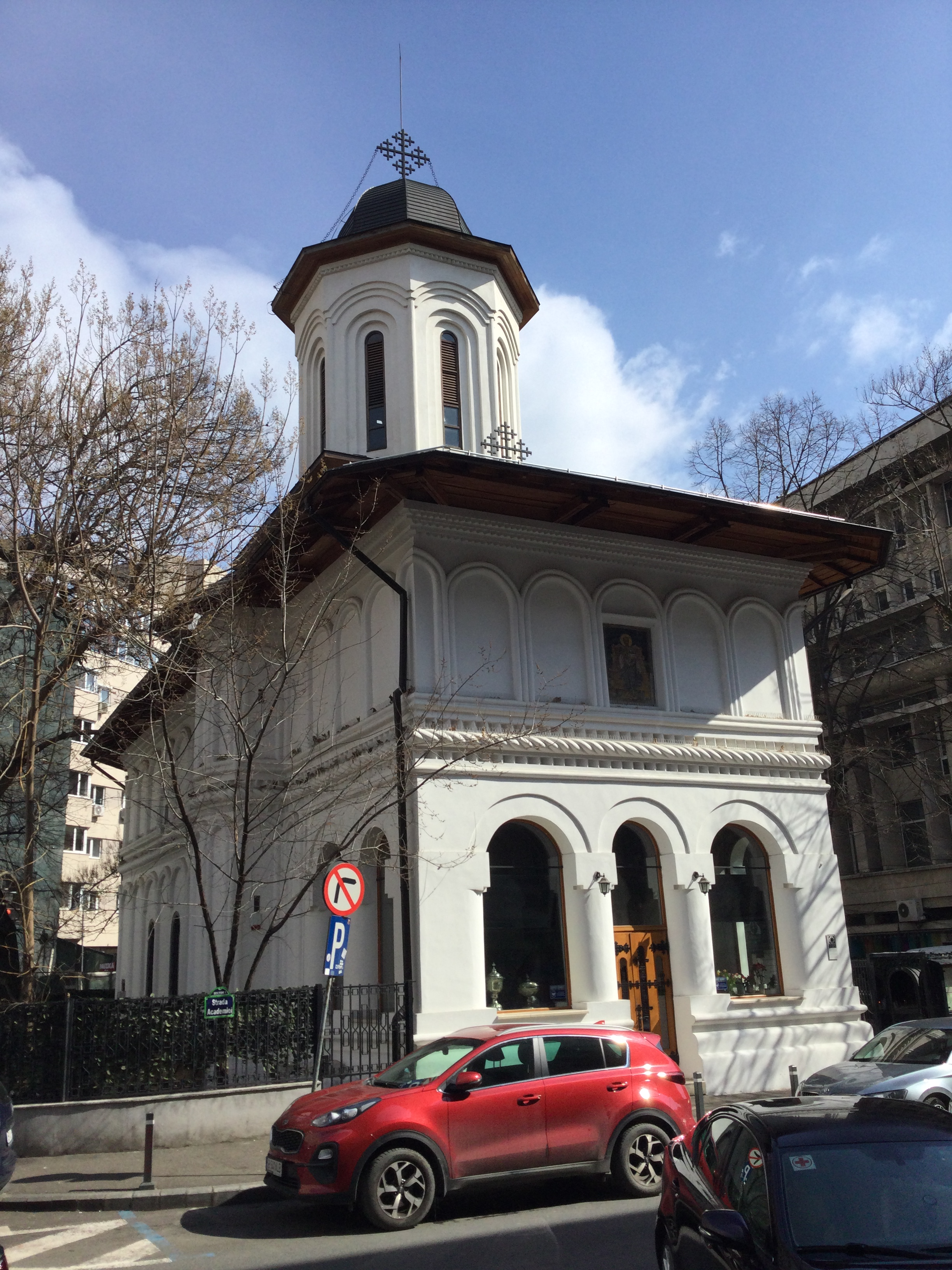
St. Nicholas in-a-Day Church

The St. Nicholas in-a-Day Church (Romanian: Biserica Sfântul Nicolae Dintr-o zi) is a Romanian Orthodox church located at 22 Academiei Street in Bucharest, Romania. It is dedicated to Saint Nicholas.

== History ==
The original church on the site was a small, early 17th-century wooden structure founded by the Postelnic Neagoe. Tradition holds that it was consecrated precisely a year after construction began; another version states that, fulfilling a bet, it was built in a single day; either legend explains the nickname. The church, along with the surrounding land and houses became the dowry of Marica, a descendant of the ktetor, when in 1673 she married future Prince Constantin Brâncoveanu. In 1702, she moved the wooden church to an estate and ordered the current church built, with Ianache Văcărescu as Ispravnic. During the 18th century, it belonged to the barbers’ guild. It had four cells, with the lot enclosed by walls. The cells were demolished between 1848 and 1918.

In the early 19th century, the building became a chapel for the princely residence on Podul Mogoșoaiei, located in the houses of Ban Dumitrache Ghica from 1813 to 1834. In order to facilitate his commute, Prince Ioan Caragea ordered the construction of a covered footbridge linking his upper-floor residence to the church. He broke part of its south wall, installing a door that led directly into the balcony. The hole, some 1.70 meters high, was later filled, but its trace remains visible. The footbridge lasted until around 1840.

The roof was damaged by fire in 1825; the church was subsequently repainted, the upper part of the walls rebuilt and the metal roof replaced by tiles. The process, lasting until 1827, rendered Grigore IV Ghica as another ktetor. The church was in very poor shape by 1909, undergoing repairs in 1914–1915. The city authorities proposed its demolition in 1915, leading to its listing as a historic monument that year. Further repairs were carried out in 1958 and from 2005. The church was reconsecrated on April 29, 2012 by Patriarch Daniel, on the occasion of its 310th anniversary and the completion of the restoration works.

== Description ==
The nave-shaped church is some 26 meters long by 8.5 meters wide, with the facade reaching 9.3 meters high. It features a portico and a bell tower above the narthex. There are no side apses; the altar apse is slightly detached, polygonal on the exterior and semicircular on the interior. The portico has three frontal arches and two pairs of side ones; these rest on massive brick columns without capitals. Since 1915, the area has been closed by glass and walls. The narthex was originally separated from the nave by three columns, eliminated after 1825. The wooden bell tower, rising 19.2 meters, sits on a square base; the original was damaged during the fire, and its current form dates to 1915–1916. The rectangular nave has a spherical ceiling.

The partly deteriorated icon of the patron saint is placed above the entrance and dates to 1702. The facades are divided into two nearly equal sections by a brick string course. The latter, composed of two rows of brick, resembles saw teeth. Both upper and lower facades are decorated with arches. Between 1911 and 1947, the church was used by the Albanian Orthodox community; at one point, Fan Noli served as parish priest.
