= Hipermestra =

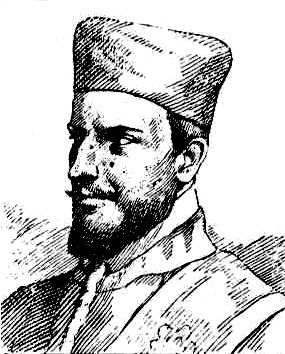
Francesco Cavalli

Hipermestra is an opera in a prologue and 3 acts by Francesco Cavalli - more specifically, it is a festa teatrale. The opera was set to a libretto by G. A. Moniglia, and was first performed at Florence on 12 June 1658. The plot is based upon the ancient tale of Hypermnestra, a story that also later served as a basis for a well-known libretto Ipermestra by Metastasio. It was staged several times up to 1680.

== Modern performances ==
The opera was revived by the Early Music festival in Utrecht in 2006 by La Sfera Armoniosa under Mike Fentross.

A modern production staged by Graham Vick and conducted by William Christie took place at Glyndebourne in 2017 .

== Roles ==
Role	Voice type
Alindo	soprano
Amore	soprano
Arbante	tenor
Arsace	tenor
Berenice	contralto
Danao	bass
Delmiro	contralto
Discordia	contralto
Elisa	soprano
Gelosia	tenor
Giove	baritone
Giunone	soprano
Hipermestra	soprano
Linceo	soprano
Vafrino	soprano
Venere	soprano
Vulcano	baritone

== Recordings ==
- L'Ipermestra La Sfera Armoniosa & Mike Fentross Utrecht Early Music Festival 2006
- Glyndebourne 2017.
