= Ipermestra (Hasse) =

Opera by Johann Adolph Hasse

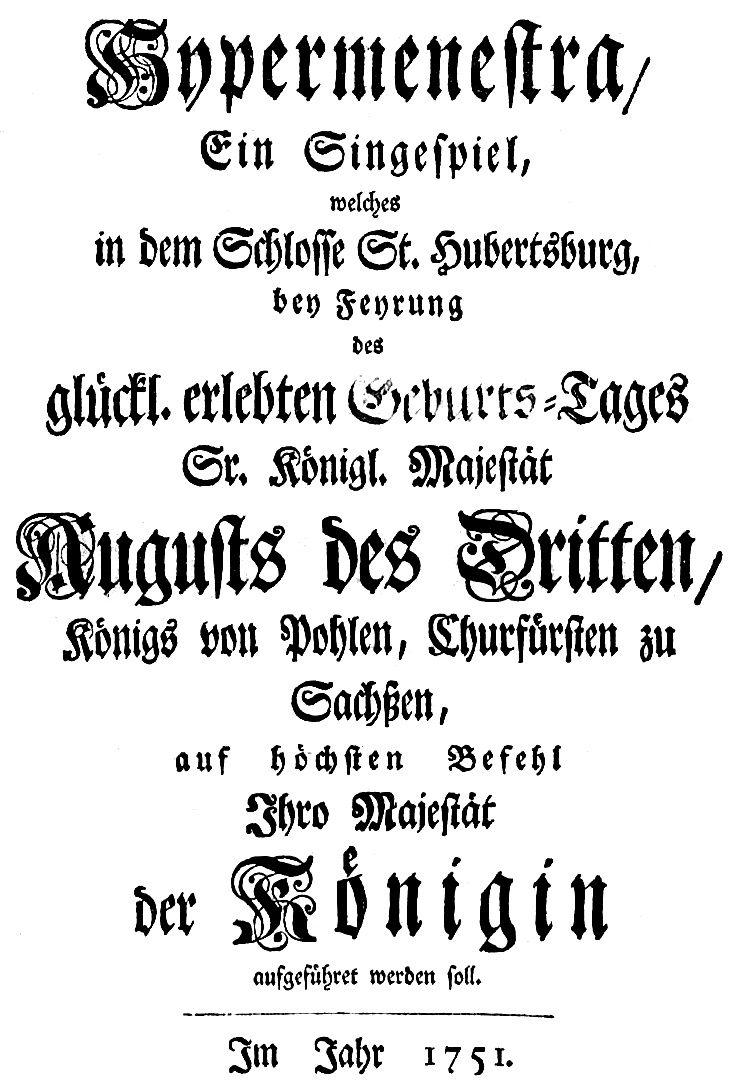
Ipermestra - German titlepage of the libretto - Hubertusburg 1751

Ipermestra is an opera by Johann Adolph Hasse. It was the first setting of the libretto by Metastasio, itself following in an already long tradition of operas based on Aeschylus' Suppliants. The opera has not received a modern recording, though Max Emanuel Cencic recorded Impermestra's aria "Ma rendi pur contento" on Rokoko - Hasse Opera Arias (2012).
