= 1812–1819 Ottoman plague epidemic =

Disease outbreak

- Disease: Plague
- Pathogen: Yersinia pestis
- Location: Ottoman Empire
- First outbreak: Kostantiniyye
- Index case: July 1812
- Deaths: Approx. 320,000

The 1812–1819 Ottoman plague epidemic was one of the last major epidemics of plague in the Ottoman Empire. This particular epidemic would cost the lives of at least 300,000 individuals. Plague epidemics occurred frequently in the Ottoman Empire between the 16th and 19th centuries.

== History ==
The disease broke out in the capital Constantinople in July 1812. It was initially mild, but by late August the situation had become critical. By September, around 2000 people were dying each day. In December the epidemic subsided, but it later reappeared. By the end of the epidemic, the Ottoman government estimated that there were 320,955 deaths, which included 220,000 Turks, 40,800 Armenians, 32,000 Jews, 28,000 Greeks, 50 Aleppines, 80 islanders and 25 Franks.

The outbreak spread throughout most of the empire's territory, including Alexandria in Egypt. In 1813, the plague reached the Ottoman vassal state of Wallachia where it became known as Caragea's plague after the country's ruler at the time. The epidemic killed about 25,000 to 30,000 people in Bucharest alone. Around the same time, the plague was also present in Bosnia, reaching Dalmatia in 1815. In 1814–15 it reappeared in Egypt, Bosnia and Albania.

The plague also spread beyond the borders of the empire. In May 1812 there was an outbreak in Poti, Georgia; in September the Crimea was hit. It had reached Odessa in August, where churches, the theatre and the exchange were closed. The duke of Richelieu played an important role. On November 22, 1812, all 32,000 residents of Odessa were forcibly imprisoned in their homes. On 7 January 1813 no more cases were reported from Odessa and the town was reopened after 66 days, but no one was allowed to leave the city. The epidemic killed 2656 people in 1812; 24 people died in 1813.

In March 1813, it was introduced to the British-held island of Malta, causing an epidemic which lasted until January 1814 and which killed around 4500 people. The epidemic spread from Malta to the nearby island of Gozo, where the outbreak killed around 100 people between March and September 1814. The epidemic also broke out on the island of Corfu in 1815.

A small plague outbreak which occurred in Noja, Italy in 1815 might have also originated from the epidemic in Dalmatia, but its exact source is not known and it is possible that the outbreak was endemic.

The next major plague epidemic in the Ottoman Empire occurred between 1835 and 1838.

== See also ==
- List of epidemics
