= Salvatore Rispoli =

Italian opera composer

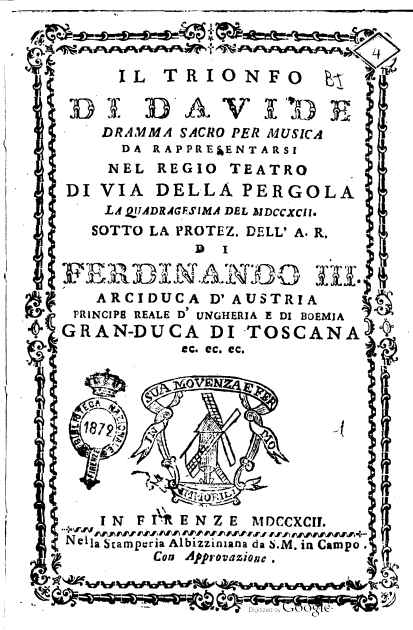
Libretto: "Il trionfo di Davide"

Salvatore Rispoli (1739 in Naples – 1812) was an Italian opera composer.

== Work ==
Works by Salvatore Rispoli:

- Il trionfo de' pupilli oppressi, 1782
- Nitteti, 1782
- Ipermestra, 1795
- Idalide, 1786
- Il trionfo di Davide, 1787
