= Gian Francesco Fortunati =

Italian composer

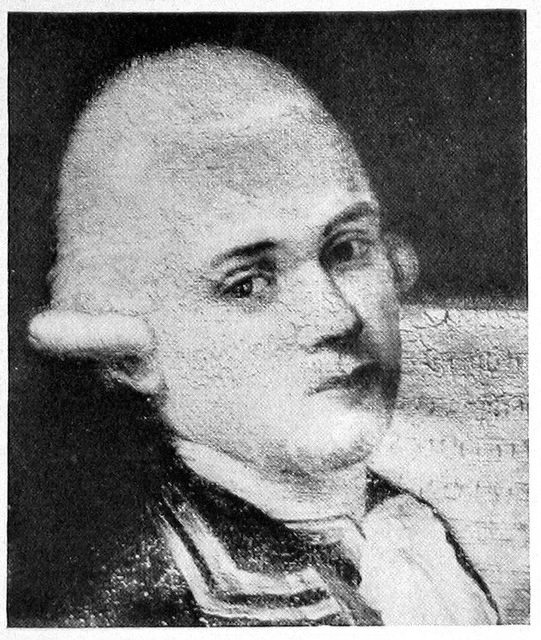
Gian Francesco Fortunati

Gian Francesco Fortunati (Parma, 27 February 1746 - 20 December 1821) was an Italian opera composer, maestro di cappella of the court at Parma.
